

444001–444100 

|-bgcolor=#E9E9E9
| 444001 ||  || — || December 18, 2003 || Socorro || LINEAR || MAR || align=right | 1.4 km || 
|-id=002 bgcolor=#E9E9E9
| 444002 ||  || — || December 27, 2003 || Socorro || LINEAR || — || align=right | 1.6 km || 
|-id=003 bgcolor=#E9E9E9
| 444003 ||  || — || December 27, 2003 || Socorro || LINEAR || — || align=right | 4.3 km || 
|-id=004 bgcolor=#FFC2E0
| 444004 ||  || — || January 13, 2004 || Socorro || LINEAR || APOPHAcritical || align=right data-sort-value="0.28" | 280 m || 
|-id=005 bgcolor=#E9E9E9
| 444005 ||  || — || January 22, 2004 || Socorro || LINEAR || EUN || align=right | 1.3 km || 
|-id=006 bgcolor=#E9E9E9
| 444006 ||  || — || January 24, 2004 || Socorro || LINEAR || — || align=right | 2.0 km || 
|-id=007 bgcolor=#E9E9E9
| 444007 ||  || — || January 18, 2004 || Kitt Peak || Spacewatch || — || align=right | 1.9 km || 
|-id=008 bgcolor=#E9E9E9
| 444008 ||  || — || December 22, 2003 || Kitt Peak || Spacewatch || EUN || align=right | 1.2 km || 
|-id=009 bgcolor=#E9E9E9
| 444009 ||  || — || January 19, 2004 || Kitt Peak || Spacewatch || — || align=right | 1.2 km || 
|-id=010 bgcolor=#E9E9E9
| 444010 ||  || — || January 30, 2004 || Kitt Peak || Spacewatch || — || align=right | 1.1 km || 
|-id=011 bgcolor=#E9E9E9
| 444011 ||  || — || February 12, 2004 || Kitt Peak || Spacewatch || — || align=right | 2.5 km || 
|-id=012 bgcolor=#E9E9E9
| 444012 ||  || — || February 11, 2004 || Kitt Peak || Spacewatch || — || align=right | 1.0 km || 
|-id=013 bgcolor=#fefefe
| 444013 ||  || — || February 17, 2004 || Kitt Peak || Spacewatch || — || align=right data-sort-value="0.83" | 830 m || 
|-id=014 bgcolor=#E9E9E9
| 444014 ||  || — || February 17, 2004 || Kitt Peak || Spacewatch || — || align=right | 1.9 km || 
|-id=015 bgcolor=#E9E9E9
| 444015 ||  || — || February 12, 2004 || Kitt Peak || Spacewatch || — || align=right | 1.8 km || 
|-id=016 bgcolor=#E9E9E9
| 444016 ||  || — || February 17, 2004 || Catalina || CSS || — || align=right | 1.8 km || 
|-id=017 bgcolor=#E9E9E9
| 444017 ||  || — || March 15, 2004 || Kitt Peak || Spacewatch || — || align=right | 2.4 km || 
|-id=018 bgcolor=#C2E0FF
| 444018 ||  || — || March 15, 2004 || Kitt Peak || M. W. Buie || cubewano (cold) || align=right | 176 km || 
|-id=019 bgcolor=#fefefe
| 444019 ||  || — || March 23, 2004 || Socorro || LINEAR || — || align=right data-sort-value="0.62" | 620 m || 
|-id=020 bgcolor=#fefefe
| 444020 ||  || — || February 23, 2004 || Socorro || LINEAR || — || align=right data-sort-value="0.71" | 710 m || 
|-id=021 bgcolor=#E9E9E9
| 444021 ||  || — || March 22, 2004 || Socorro || LINEAR || — || align=right | 2.3 km || 
|-id=022 bgcolor=#E9E9E9
| 444022 ||  || — || March 16, 2004 || Kitt Peak || Spacewatch || — || align=right | 2.3 km || 
|-id=023 bgcolor=#fefefe
| 444023 ||  || — || April 12, 2004 || Siding Spring || SSS || — || align=right | 1.1 km || 
|-id=024 bgcolor=#fefefe
| 444024 ||  || — || April 13, 2004 || Catalina || CSS || — || align=right | 1.3 km || 
|-id=025 bgcolor=#C2E0FF
| 444025 ||  || — || April 26, 2004 || Mauna Kea || B. Gladman || cubewano (cold) || align=right | 185 km || 
|-id=026 bgcolor=#fefefe
| 444026 ||  || — || May 12, 2004 || Anderson Mesa || LONEOS || — || align=right data-sort-value="0.80" | 800 m || 
|-id=027 bgcolor=#d6d6d6
| 444027 ||  || — || May 23, 2004 || Socorro || LINEAR || BRA || align=right | 2.0 km || 
|-id=028 bgcolor=#d6d6d6
| 444028 ||  || — || June 11, 2004 || Kitt Peak || Spacewatch || — || align=right | 2.2 km || 
|-id=029 bgcolor=#fefefe
| 444029 ||  || — || July 11, 2004 || Socorro || LINEAR || — || align=right data-sort-value="0.86" | 860 m || 
|-id=030 bgcolor=#C2E0FF
| 444030 ||  || — || July 13, 2004 || Palomar || Palomar Obs. || other TNO || align=right | 513 km || 
|-id=031 bgcolor=#FA8072
| 444031 ||  || — || August 7, 2004 || Siding Spring || SSS || — || align=right | 1.0 km || 
|-id=032 bgcolor=#fefefe
| 444032 ||  || — || August 8, 2004 || Socorro || LINEAR || — || align=right data-sort-value="0.96" | 960 m || 
|-id=033 bgcolor=#fefefe
| 444033 ||  || — || August 6, 2004 || Campo Imperatore || CINEOS || — || align=right data-sort-value="0.78" | 780 m || 
|-id=034 bgcolor=#fefefe
| 444034 ||  || — || August 7, 2004 || Palomar || NEAT || — || align=right data-sort-value="0.81" | 810 m || 
|-id=035 bgcolor=#d6d6d6
| 444035 ||  || — || August 8, 2004 || Socorro || LINEAR || — || align=right | 3.3 km || 
|-id=036 bgcolor=#fefefe
| 444036 ||  || — || August 7, 2004 || Palomar || NEAT || — || align=right data-sort-value="0.82" | 820 m || 
|-id=037 bgcolor=#d6d6d6
| 444037 ||  || — || June 27, 2004 || Siding Spring || SSS || — || align=right | 2.7 km || 
|-id=038 bgcolor=#d6d6d6
| 444038 ||  || — || July 17, 2004 || Socorro || LINEAR || — || align=right | 2.9 km || 
|-id=039 bgcolor=#d6d6d6
| 444039 ||  || — || August 10, 2004 || Socorro || LINEAR || — || align=right | 3.6 km || 
|-id=040 bgcolor=#d6d6d6
| 444040 ||  || — || August 11, 2004 || Palomar || NEAT || — || align=right | 3.8 km || 
|-id=041 bgcolor=#fefefe
| 444041 ||  || — || August 7, 2004 || Palomar || NEAT || — || align=right data-sort-value="0.65" | 650 m || 
|-id=042 bgcolor=#fefefe
| 444042 ||  || — || August 12, 2004 || Palomar || NEAT || — || align=right data-sort-value="0.86" | 860 m || 
|-id=043 bgcolor=#fefefe
| 444043 ||  || — || August 17, 2004 || Socorro || LINEAR || H || align=right data-sort-value="0.94" | 940 m || 
|-id=044 bgcolor=#fefefe
| 444044 ||  || — || August 21, 2004 || Siding Spring || SSS || — || align=right data-sort-value="0.88" | 880 m || 
|-id=045 bgcolor=#fefefe
| 444045 ||  || — || August 21, 2004 || Siding Spring || SSS || H || align=right data-sort-value="0.68" | 680 m || 
|-id=046 bgcolor=#d6d6d6
| 444046 ||  || — || August 25, 2004 || Kitt Peak || Spacewatch || — || align=right | 2.3 km || 
|-id=047 bgcolor=#fefefe
| 444047 ||  || — || August 8, 2004 || Anderson Mesa || LONEOS || — || align=right data-sort-value="0.75" | 750 m || 
|-id=048 bgcolor=#d6d6d6
| 444048 ||  || — || September 7, 2004 || Kitt Peak || Spacewatch || — || align=right | 2.7 km || 
|-id=049 bgcolor=#fefefe
| 444049 ||  || — || September 8, 2004 || Campo Imperatore || CINEOS || NYS || align=right data-sort-value="0.73" | 730 m || 
|-id=050 bgcolor=#fefefe
| 444050 ||  || — || September 8, 2004 || Socorro || LINEAR || MAS || align=right data-sort-value="0.60" | 600 m || 
|-id=051 bgcolor=#d6d6d6
| 444051 ||  || — || September 8, 2004 || Socorro || LINEAR || — || align=right | 3.4 km || 
|-id=052 bgcolor=#fefefe
| 444052 ||  || — || September 8, 2004 || Socorro || LINEAR || NYS || align=right data-sort-value="0.60" | 600 m || 
|-id=053 bgcolor=#fefefe
| 444053 ||  || — || September 8, 2004 || Socorro || LINEAR || — || align=right data-sort-value="0.96" | 960 m || 
|-id=054 bgcolor=#fefefe
| 444054 ||  || — || September 10, 2004 || Kitt Peak || Spacewatch || H || align=right data-sort-value="0.64" | 640 m || 
|-id=055 bgcolor=#d6d6d6
| 444055 ||  || — || August 26, 2004 || Catalina || CSS || — || align=right | 3.2 km || 
|-id=056 bgcolor=#d6d6d6
| 444056 ||  || — || September 7, 2004 || Kitt Peak || Spacewatch || EOS || align=right | 1.8 km || 
|-id=057 bgcolor=#d6d6d6
| 444057 ||  || — || August 19, 2004 || Socorro || LINEAR || — || align=right | 3.6 km || 
|-id=058 bgcolor=#d6d6d6
| 444058 ||  || — || September 9, 2004 || Socorro || LINEAR || — || align=right | 2.5 km || 
|-id=059 bgcolor=#fefefe
| 444059 ||  || — || September 10, 2004 || Socorro || LINEAR || — || align=right data-sort-value="0.82" | 820 m || 
|-id=060 bgcolor=#fefefe
| 444060 ||  || — || September 11, 2004 || Socorro || LINEAR || — || align=right data-sort-value="0.75" | 750 m || 
|-id=061 bgcolor=#fefefe
| 444061 ||  || — || September 7, 2004 || Socorro || LINEAR || MAS || align=right data-sort-value="0.60" | 600 m || 
|-id=062 bgcolor=#fefefe
| 444062 ||  || — || August 11, 2004 || Socorro || LINEAR || — || align=right data-sort-value="0.90" | 900 m || 
|-id=063 bgcolor=#fefefe
| 444063 ||  || — || September 10, 2004 || Socorro || LINEAR || — || align=right | 1.0 km || 
|-id=064 bgcolor=#d6d6d6
| 444064 ||  || — || September 10, 2004 || Socorro || LINEAR || — || align=right | 3.4 km || 
|-id=065 bgcolor=#d6d6d6
| 444065 ||  || — || September 10, 2004 || Socorro || LINEAR || — || align=right | 2.6 km || 
|-id=066 bgcolor=#fefefe
| 444066 ||  || — || September 11, 2004 || Socorro || LINEAR || — || align=right | 2.0 km || 
|-id=067 bgcolor=#d6d6d6
| 444067 ||  || — || September 11, 2004 || Socorro || LINEAR || — || align=right | 3.9 km || 
|-id=068 bgcolor=#fefefe
| 444068 ||  || — || August 11, 2004 || Socorro || LINEAR || — || align=right data-sort-value="0.82" | 820 m || 
|-id=069 bgcolor=#d6d6d6
| 444069 ||  || — || September 9, 2004 || Kitt Peak || Spacewatch || — || align=right | 2.8 km || 
|-id=070 bgcolor=#d6d6d6
| 444070 ||  || — || September 10, 2004 || Kitt Peak || Spacewatch || THM || align=right | 2.0 km || 
|-id=071 bgcolor=#d6d6d6
| 444071 ||  || — || September 7, 2004 || Socorro || LINEAR || — || align=right | 3.3 km || 
|-id=072 bgcolor=#fefefe
| 444072 ||  || — || September 10, 2004 || Kitt Peak || Spacewatch || — || align=right data-sort-value="0.78" | 780 m || 
|-id=073 bgcolor=#d6d6d6
| 444073 ||  || — || September 11, 2004 || Kitt Peak || Spacewatch || THM || align=right | 1.8 km || 
|-id=074 bgcolor=#d6d6d6
| 444074 ||  || — || September 15, 2004 || Kitt Peak || Spacewatch || THM || align=right | 2.1 km || 
|-id=075 bgcolor=#fefefe
| 444075 ||  || — || September 11, 2004 || Kitt Peak || Spacewatch || — || align=right data-sort-value="0.65" | 650 m || 
|-id=076 bgcolor=#fefefe
| 444076 ||  || — || September 11, 2004 || Kitt Peak || Spacewatch || NYS || align=right data-sort-value="0.58" | 580 m || 
|-id=077 bgcolor=#d6d6d6
| 444077 ||  || — || September 12, 2004 || Socorro || LINEAR || — || align=right | 3.7 km || 
|-id=078 bgcolor=#d6d6d6
| 444078 ||  || — || September 15, 2004 || Kitt Peak || Spacewatch || — || align=right | 2.6 km || 
|-id=079 bgcolor=#d6d6d6
| 444079 ||  || — || September 15, 2004 || Siding Spring || SSS || — || align=right | 3.7 km || 
|-id=080 bgcolor=#d6d6d6
| 444080 ||  || — || September 15, 2004 || Kitt Peak || Spacewatch || — || align=right | 2.4 km || 
|-id=081 bgcolor=#fefefe
| 444081 ||  || — || September 17, 2004 || Socorro || LINEAR || H || align=right data-sort-value="0.60" | 600 m || 
|-id=082 bgcolor=#fefefe
| 444082 ||  || — || September 21, 2004 || Socorro || LINEAR || — || align=right | 1.3 km || 
|-id=083 bgcolor=#fefefe
| 444083 ||  || — || September 17, 2004 || Kitt Peak || Spacewatch || — || align=right data-sort-value="0.80" | 800 m || 
|-id=084 bgcolor=#d6d6d6
| 444084 ||  || — || September 7, 2004 || Kitt Peak || Spacewatch || — || align=right | 2.4 km || 
|-id=085 bgcolor=#d6d6d6
| 444085 ||  || — || September 13, 2004 || Anderson Mesa || LONEOS || THB || align=right | 3.3 km || 
|-id=086 bgcolor=#d6d6d6
| 444086 ||  || — || September 18, 2004 || Socorro || LINEAR || — || align=right | 3.5 km || 
|-id=087 bgcolor=#d6d6d6
| 444087 ||  || — || September 18, 2004 || Socorro || LINEAR || — || align=right | 3.7 km || 
|-id=088 bgcolor=#d6d6d6
| 444088 ||  || — || August 19, 2004 || Siding Spring || SSS || THB || align=right | 2.9 km || 
|-id=089 bgcolor=#fefefe
| 444089 ||  || — || September 9, 2004 || Socorro || LINEAR || — || align=right | 1.0 km || 
|-id=090 bgcolor=#fefefe
| 444090 ||  || — || October 8, 2004 || Socorro || LINEAR || H || align=right data-sort-value="0.87" | 870 m || 
|-id=091 bgcolor=#fefefe
| 444091 ||  || — || October 9, 2004 || Socorro || LINEAR || — || align=right data-sort-value="0.86" | 860 m || 
|-id=092 bgcolor=#fefefe
| 444092 ||  || — || October 4, 2004 || Kitt Peak || Spacewatch || NYS || align=right data-sort-value="0.59" | 590 m || 
|-id=093 bgcolor=#d6d6d6
| 444093 ||  || — || October 4, 2004 || Kitt Peak || Spacewatch || VER || align=right | 3.0 km || 
|-id=094 bgcolor=#fefefe
| 444094 ||  || — || October 4, 2004 || Kitt Peak || Spacewatch || — || align=right data-sort-value="0.84" | 840 m || 
|-id=095 bgcolor=#fefefe
| 444095 ||  || — || September 22, 2004 || Kitt Peak || Spacewatch || NYS || align=right data-sort-value="0.55" | 550 m || 
|-id=096 bgcolor=#d6d6d6
| 444096 ||  || — || October 4, 2004 || Kitt Peak || Spacewatch || — || align=right | 2.9 km || 
|-id=097 bgcolor=#d6d6d6
| 444097 ||  || — || September 9, 2004 || Campo Imperatore || CINEOS || — || align=right | 3.2 km || 
|-id=098 bgcolor=#d6d6d6
| 444098 ||  || — || October 4, 2004 || Kitt Peak || Spacewatch || — || align=right | 3.3 km || 
|-id=099 bgcolor=#d6d6d6
| 444099 ||  || — || September 9, 2004 || Kitt Peak || Spacewatch || — || align=right | 2.1 km || 
|-id=100 bgcolor=#d6d6d6
| 444100 ||  || — || September 10, 2004 || Kitt Peak || Spacewatch || THM || align=right | 2.1 km || 
|}

444101–444200 

|-bgcolor=#fefefe
| 444101 ||  || — || October 4, 2004 || Kitt Peak || Spacewatch || — || align=right data-sort-value="0.67" | 670 m || 
|-id=102 bgcolor=#fefefe
| 444102 ||  || — || October 4, 2004 || Kitt Peak || Spacewatch || — || align=right data-sort-value="0.75" | 750 m || 
|-id=103 bgcolor=#fefefe
| 444103 ||  || — || October 4, 2004 || Kitt Peak || Spacewatch || NYS || align=right data-sort-value="0.61" | 610 m || 
|-id=104 bgcolor=#d6d6d6
| 444104 ||  || — || October 5, 2004 || Kitt Peak || Spacewatch || — || align=right | 2.3 km || 
|-id=105 bgcolor=#d6d6d6
| 444105 ||  || — || October 5, 2004 || Kitt Peak || Spacewatch || THM || align=right | 2.1 km || 
|-id=106 bgcolor=#d6d6d6
| 444106 ||  || — || October 5, 2004 || Anderson Mesa || LONEOS || — || align=right | 2.9 km || 
|-id=107 bgcolor=#fefefe
| 444107 ||  || — || October 5, 2004 || Kitt Peak || Spacewatch || — || align=right data-sort-value="0.60" | 600 m || 
|-id=108 bgcolor=#d6d6d6
| 444108 ||  || — || September 17, 2004 || Kitt Peak || Spacewatch || — || align=right | 2.4 km || 
|-id=109 bgcolor=#d6d6d6
| 444109 ||  || — || October 7, 2004 || Kitt Peak || Spacewatch || — || align=right | 3.1 km || 
|-id=110 bgcolor=#d6d6d6
| 444110 ||  || — || October 7, 2004 || Kitt Peak || Spacewatch || — || align=right | 3.4 km || 
|-id=111 bgcolor=#d6d6d6
| 444111 ||  || — || October 6, 2004 || Palomar || NEAT || — || align=right | 3.2 km || 
|-id=112 bgcolor=#d6d6d6
| 444112 ||  || — || October 6, 2004 || Palomar || NEAT || — || align=right | 3.3 km || 
|-id=113 bgcolor=#fefefe
| 444113 ||  || — || September 22, 2004 || Socorro || LINEAR || MAS || align=right data-sort-value="0.75" | 750 m || 
|-id=114 bgcolor=#d6d6d6
| 444114 ||  || — || September 18, 2004 || Socorro || LINEAR || TIR || align=right | 3.2 km || 
|-id=115 bgcolor=#d6d6d6
| 444115 ||  || — || October 4, 2004 || Kitt Peak || Spacewatch || — || align=right | 3.6 km || 
|-id=116 bgcolor=#d6d6d6
| 444116 ||  || — || September 10, 2004 || Kitt Peak || Spacewatch || EMA || align=right | 3.0 km || 
|-id=117 bgcolor=#d6d6d6
| 444117 ||  || — || October 6, 2004 || Kitt Peak || Spacewatch || EOS || align=right | 1.4 km || 
|-id=118 bgcolor=#fefefe
| 444118 ||  || — || October 6, 2004 || Kitt Peak || Spacewatch || — || align=right data-sort-value="0.85" | 850 m || 
|-id=119 bgcolor=#d6d6d6
| 444119 ||  || — || October 6, 2004 || Kitt Peak || Spacewatch || VER || align=right | 2.9 km || 
|-id=120 bgcolor=#d6d6d6
| 444120 ||  || — || October 7, 2004 || Kitt Peak || Spacewatch || EOS || align=right | 2.4 km || 
|-id=121 bgcolor=#d6d6d6
| 444121 ||  || — || October 7, 2004 || Kitt Peak || Spacewatch || ELF || align=right | 3.3 km || 
|-id=122 bgcolor=#d6d6d6
| 444122 ||  || — || October 7, 2004 || Kitt Peak || Spacewatch || — || align=right | 2.7 km || 
|-id=123 bgcolor=#fefefe
| 444123 ||  || — || September 7, 2004 || Kitt Peak || Spacewatch || — || align=right data-sort-value="0.78" | 780 m || 
|-id=124 bgcolor=#d6d6d6
| 444124 ||  || — || October 7, 2004 || Kitt Peak || Spacewatch || — || align=right | 3.9 km || 
|-id=125 bgcolor=#d6d6d6
| 444125 ||  || — || October 8, 2004 || Kitt Peak || Spacewatch || Tj (2.99) || align=right | 3.3 km || 
|-id=126 bgcolor=#fefefe
| 444126 ||  || — || October 10, 2004 || Kitt Peak || Spacewatch || — || align=right data-sort-value="0.66" | 660 m || 
|-id=127 bgcolor=#d6d6d6
| 444127 ||  || — || October 8, 2004 || Socorro || LINEAR || — || align=right | 4.6 km || 
|-id=128 bgcolor=#d6d6d6
| 444128 ||  || — || October 9, 2004 || Kitt Peak || Spacewatch || THM || align=right | 1.8 km || 
|-id=129 bgcolor=#fefefe
| 444129 ||  || — || October 9, 2004 || Kitt Peak || Spacewatch || (5026) || align=right data-sort-value="0.86" | 860 m || 
|-id=130 bgcolor=#d6d6d6
| 444130 ||  || — || October 9, 2004 || Anderson Mesa || LONEOS || — || align=right | 3.5 km || 
|-id=131 bgcolor=#d6d6d6
| 444131 ||  || — || September 13, 2004 || Anderson Mesa || LONEOS || — || align=right | 2.4 km || 
|-id=132 bgcolor=#d6d6d6
| 444132 ||  || — || October 14, 2004 || Kitt Peak || Spacewatch || EOS || align=right | 2.1 km || 
|-id=133 bgcolor=#fefefe
| 444133 ||  || — || October 4, 2004 || Kitt Peak || Spacewatch || — || align=right data-sort-value="0.75" | 750 m || 
|-id=134 bgcolor=#fefefe
| 444134 ||  || — || October 10, 2004 || Kitt Peak || M. W. Buie || — || align=right data-sort-value="0.77" | 770 m || 
|-id=135 bgcolor=#fefefe
| 444135 ||  || — || October 18, 2004 || Socorro || LINEAR || — || align=right data-sort-value="0.86" | 860 m || 
|-id=136 bgcolor=#fefefe
| 444136 ||  || — || November 2, 2004 || Anderson Mesa || LONEOS || — || align=right data-sort-value="0.98" | 980 m || 
|-id=137 bgcolor=#fefefe
| 444137 ||  || — || October 9, 2004 || Kitt Peak || Spacewatch || — || align=right data-sort-value="0.95" | 950 m || 
|-id=138 bgcolor=#d6d6d6
| 444138 ||  || — || November 5, 2004 || Palomar || NEAT || — || align=right | 4.9 km || 
|-id=139 bgcolor=#d6d6d6
| 444139 ||  || — || November 6, 2004 || Needville || J. Dellinger, A. Lowe || HYG || align=right | 2.8 km || 
|-id=140 bgcolor=#fefefe
| 444140 ||  || — || November 4, 2004 || Catalina || CSS || — || align=right data-sort-value="0.87" | 870 m || 
|-id=141 bgcolor=#fefefe
| 444141 ||  || — || November 4, 2004 || Kitt Peak || Spacewatch || — || align=right data-sort-value="0.75" | 750 m || 
|-id=142 bgcolor=#d6d6d6
| 444142 ||  || — || October 10, 2004 || Kitt Peak || Spacewatch || — || align=right | 2.3 km || 
|-id=143 bgcolor=#d6d6d6
| 444143 ||  || — || November 4, 2004 || Kitt Peak || Spacewatch || LIX || align=right | 3.4 km || 
|-id=144 bgcolor=#fefefe
| 444144 ||  || — || November 4, 2004 || Kitt Peak || Spacewatch || — || align=right data-sort-value="0.88" | 880 m || 
|-id=145 bgcolor=#d6d6d6
| 444145 ||  || — || September 25, 2004 || Socorro || LINEAR || — || align=right | 4.2 km || 
|-id=146 bgcolor=#fefefe
| 444146 ||  || — || November 17, 2004 || Campo Imperatore || CINEOS || — || align=right data-sort-value="0.82" | 820 m || 
|-id=147 bgcolor=#fefefe
| 444147 ||  || — || December 8, 2004 || Socorro || LINEAR || NYS || align=right data-sort-value="0.64" | 640 m || 
|-id=148 bgcolor=#fefefe
| 444148 ||  || — || December 9, 2004 || Kitt Peak || Spacewatch || NYS || align=right data-sort-value="0.69" | 690 m || 
|-id=149 bgcolor=#fefefe
| 444149 ||  || — || November 10, 2004 || Kitt Peak || Spacewatch || — || align=right data-sort-value="0.81" | 810 m || 
|-id=150 bgcolor=#fefefe
| 444150 ||  || — || November 10, 2004 || Kitt Peak || Spacewatch || — || align=right data-sort-value="0.90" | 900 m || 
|-id=151 bgcolor=#E9E9E9
| 444151 ||  || — || March 9, 2005 || Socorro || LINEAR || — || align=right | 1.7 km || 
|-id=152 bgcolor=#E9E9E9
| 444152 ||  || — || March 8, 2005 || Mount Lemmon || Mount Lemmon Survey || — || align=right | 2.1 km || 
|-id=153 bgcolor=#E9E9E9
| 444153 ||  || — || March 9, 2005 || Kitt Peak || Spacewatch || — || align=right | 1.3 km || 
|-id=154 bgcolor=#E9E9E9
| 444154 ||  || — || March 10, 2005 || Mount Lemmon || Mount Lemmon Survey || — || align=right | 2.0 km || 
|-id=155 bgcolor=#E9E9E9
| 444155 ||  || — || March 11, 2005 || Mount Lemmon || Mount Lemmon Survey || — || align=right | 1.3 km || 
|-id=156 bgcolor=#E9E9E9
| 444156 ||  || — || March 13, 2005 || Kitt Peak || Spacewatch || — || align=right | 2.0 km || 
|-id=157 bgcolor=#E9E9E9
| 444157 ||  || — || April 5, 2005 || Siding Spring || SSS || — || align=right | 2.0 km || 
|-id=158 bgcolor=#E9E9E9
| 444158 ||  || — || March 9, 2005 || Mount Lemmon || Mount Lemmon Survey || — || align=right | 1.7 km || 
|-id=159 bgcolor=#E9E9E9
| 444159 ||  || — || April 4, 2005 || Kitt Peak || Spacewatch || — || align=right | 1.6 km || 
|-id=160 bgcolor=#E9E9E9
| 444160 ||  || — || April 11, 2005 || Kitt Peak || Spacewatch || — || align=right | 1.3 km || 
|-id=161 bgcolor=#E9E9E9
| 444161 ||  || — || April 10, 2005 || Mount Lemmon || Mount Lemmon Survey || — || align=right | 2.5 km || 
|-id=162 bgcolor=#E9E9E9
| 444162 ||  || — || April 7, 2005 || Kitt Peak || Spacewatch || — || align=right | 2.2 km || 
|-id=163 bgcolor=#FA8072
| 444163 ||  || — || April 14, 2005 || Kitt Peak || Spacewatch || — || align=right data-sort-value="0.75" | 750 m || 
|-id=164 bgcolor=#E9E9E9
| 444164 ||  || — || May 1, 2005 || Kitt Peak || Spacewatch || — || align=right | 1.6 km || 
|-id=165 bgcolor=#E9E9E9
| 444165 ||  || — || May 3, 2005 || Kitt Peak || Spacewatch || — || align=right | 1.8 km || 
|-id=166 bgcolor=#E9E9E9
| 444166 ||  || — || May 10, 2005 || Mount Lemmon || Mount Lemmon Survey || — || align=right | 2.3 km || 
|-id=167 bgcolor=#E9E9E9
| 444167 ||  || — || May 11, 2005 || Kitt Peak || Spacewatch || — || align=right | 2.1 km || 
|-id=168 bgcolor=#E9E9E9
| 444168 ||  || — || May 8, 2005 || Kitt Peak || Spacewatch || — || align=right | 1.5 km || 
|-id=169 bgcolor=#E9E9E9
| 444169 ||  || — || May 12, 2005 || Bergisch Gladbach || W. Bickel || — || align=right | 2.5 km || 
|-id=170 bgcolor=#E9E9E9
| 444170 ||  || — || May 11, 2005 || Anderson Mesa || LONEOS || — || align=right | 2.0 km || 
|-id=171 bgcolor=#fefefe
| 444171 ||  || — || May 16, 2005 || Kitt Peak || Spacewatch || — || align=right data-sort-value="0.59" | 590 m || 
|-id=172 bgcolor=#E9E9E9
| 444172 ||  || — || June 1, 2005 || Kitt Peak || Spacewatch || — || align=right | 2.1 km || 
|-id=173 bgcolor=#fefefe
| 444173 ||  || — || July 9, 2005 || Kitt Peak || Spacewatch || — || align=right data-sort-value="0.48" | 480 m || 
|-id=174 bgcolor=#d6d6d6
| 444174 ||  || — || June 13, 2005 || Mount Lemmon || Mount Lemmon Survey || — || align=right | 2.2 km || 
|-id=175 bgcolor=#fefefe
| 444175 ||  || — || July 1, 2005 || Kitt Peak || Spacewatch || — || align=right data-sort-value="0.78" | 780 m || 
|-id=176 bgcolor=#fefefe
| 444176 ||  || — || July 28, 2005 || Palomar || NEAT || — || align=right data-sort-value="0.94" | 940 m || 
|-id=177 bgcolor=#fefefe
| 444177 ||  || — || July 4, 2005 || Kitt Peak || Spacewatch || — || align=right data-sort-value="0.62" | 620 m || 
|-id=178 bgcolor=#E9E9E9
| 444178 ||  || — || August 22, 2005 || Palomar || NEAT || MRX || align=right | 1.3 km || 
|-id=179 bgcolor=#d6d6d6
| 444179 ||  || — || August 26, 2005 || Palomar || NEAT || — || align=right | 2.0 km || 
|-id=180 bgcolor=#d6d6d6
| 444180 ||  || — || August 28, 2005 || Kitt Peak || Spacewatch || — || align=right | 2.5 km || 
|-id=181 bgcolor=#d6d6d6
| 444181 ||  || — || August 28, 2005 || Kitt Peak || Spacewatch || — || align=right | 2.2 km || 
|-id=182 bgcolor=#fefefe
| 444182 ||  || — || August 26, 2005 || Palomar || NEAT || — || align=right data-sort-value="0.82" | 820 m || 
|-id=183 bgcolor=#fefefe
| 444183 ||  || — || August 30, 2005 || Kitt Peak || Spacewatch || — || align=right data-sort-value="0.75" | 750 m || 
|-id=184 bgcolor=#fefefe
| 444184 ||  || — || September 1, 2005 || Kitt Peak || Spacewatch || — || align=right data-sort-value="0.75" | 750 m || 
|-id=185 bgcolor=#FFC2E0
| 444185 ||  || — || September 23, 2005 || Kitt Peak || Spacewatch || AMO || align=right data-sort-value="0.54" | 540 m || 
|-id=186 bgcolor=#fefefe
| 444186 ||  || — || September 26, 2005 || Kitt Peak || Spacewatch || — || align=right data-sort-value="0.57" | 570 m || 
|-id=187 bgcolor=#fefefe
| 444187 ||  || — || September 26, 2005 || Catalina || CSS || — || align=right data-sort-value="0.75" | 750 m || 
|-id=188 bgcolor=#d6d6d6
| 444188 ||  || — || September 23, 2005 || Kitt Peak || Spacewatch || EOS || align=right | 1.7 km || 
|-id=189 bgcolor=#fefefe
| 444189 ||  || — || September 24, 2005 || Kitt Peak || Spacewatch || — || align=right data-sort-value="0.86" | 860 m || 
|-id=190 bgcolor=#d6d6d6
| 444190 ||  || — || September 26, 2005 || Kitt Peak || Spacewatch || EOS || align=right | 1.6 km || 
|-id=191 bgcolor=#d6d6d6
| 444191 ||  || — || September 26, 2005 || Kitt Peak || Spacewatch || — || align=right | 2.5 km || 
|-id=192 bgcolor=#d6d6d6
| 444192 ||  || — || September 27, 2005 || Kitt Peak || Spacewatch || — || align=right | 1.9 km || 
|-id=193 bgcolor=#FFC2E0
| 444193 ||  || — || September 30, 2005 || Mount Lemmon || Mount Lemmon Survey || APO +1kmPHA || align=right data-sort-value="0.44" | 440 m || 
|-id=194 bgcolor=#fefefe
| 444194 ||  || — || September 24, 2005 || Kitt Peak || Spacewatch || — || align=right data-sort-value="0.86" | 860 m || 
|-id=195 bgcolor=#fefefe
| 444195 ||  || — || September 24, 2005 || Kitt Peak || Spacewatch || — || align=right data-sort-value="0.78" | 780 m || 
|-id=196 bgcolor=#fefefe
| 444196 ||  || — || September 24, 2005 || Kitt Peak || Spacewatch || — || align=right data-sort-value="0.75" | 750 m || 
|-id=197 bgcolor=#fefefe
| 444197 ||  || — || September 26, 2005 || Kitt Peak || Spacewatch || — || align=right data-sort-value="0.57" | 570 m || 
|-id=198 bgcolor=#fefefe
| 444198 ||  || — || September 1, 2005 || Kitt Peak || Spacewatch || — || align=right data-sort-value="0.66" | 660 m || 
|-id=199 bgcolor=#d6d6d6
| 444199 ||  || — || September 25, 2005 || Kitt Peak || Spacewatch || — || align=right | 1.8 km || 
|-id=200 bgcolor=#d6d6d6
| 444200 ||  || — || September 26, 2005 || Kitt Peak || Spacewatch || KOR || align=right | 1.4 km || 
|}

444201–444300 

|-bgcolor=#fefefe
| 444201 ||  || — || September 29, 2005 || Kitt Peak || Spacewatch || — || align=right data-sort-value="0.78" | 780 m || 
|-id=202 bgcolor=#d6d6d6
| 444202 ||  || — || September 30, 2005 || Mount Lemmon || Mount Lemmon Survey || HYG || align=right | 2.9 km || 
|-id=203 bgcolor=#d6d6d6
| 444203 ||  || — || September 29, 2005 || Kitt Peak || Spacewatch || — || align=right | 2.2 km || 
|-id=204 bgcolor=#fefefe
| 444204 ||  || — || August 31, 2005 || Kitt Peak || Spacewatch || — || align=right data-sort-value="0.77" | 770 m || 
|-id=205 bgcolor=#d6d6d6
| 444205 ||  || — || September 25, 2005 || Apache Point || A. C. Becker || — || align=right | 3.4 km || 
|-id=206 bgcolor=#d6d6d6
| 444206 ||  || — || September 30, 2005 || Mount Lemmon || Mount Lemmon Survey || — || align=right | 1.7 km || 
|-id=207 bgcolor=#d6d6d6
| 444207 ||  || — || September 23, 2005 || Catalina || CSS || EOS || align=right | 2.0 km || 
|-id=208 bgcolor=#d6d6d6
| 444208 ||  || — || October 1, 2005 || Kitt Peak || Spacewatch || KOR || align=right | 1.2 km || 
|-id=209 bgcolor=#fefefe
| 444209 ||  || — || October 1, 2005 || Catalina || CSS || — || align=right data-sort-value="0.74" | 740 m || 
|-id=210 bgcolor=#fefefe
| 444210 ||  || — || October 1, 2005 || Mount Lemmon || Mount Lemmon Survey || — || align=right data-sort-value="0.83" | 830 m || 
|-id=211 bgcolor=#d6d6d6
| 444211 ||  || — || October 1, 2005 || Mount Lemmon || Mount Lemmon Survey || — || align=right | 1.6 km || 
|-id=212 bgcolor=#d6d6d6
| 444212 ||  || — || October 5, 2005 || Kitt Peak || Spacewatch || — || align=right | 2.6 km || 
|-id=213 bgcolor=#d6d6d6
| 444213 ||  || — || October 7, 2005 || Mount Lemmon || Mount Lemmon Survey || — || align=right | 1.6 km || 
|-id=214 bgcolor=#d6d6d6
| 444214 ||  || — || October 7, 2005 || Kitt Peak || Spacewatch || — || align=right | 1.8 km || 
|-id=215 bgcolor=#fefefe
| 444215 ||  || — || October 3, 2005 || Catalina || CSS || — || align=right data-sort-value="0.66" | 660 m || 
|-id=216 bgcolor=#fefefe
| 444216 ||  || — || October 5, 2005 || Kitt Peak || Spacewatch || — || align=right data-sort-value="0.63" | 630 m || 
|-id=217 bgcolor=#fefefe
| 444217 ||  || — || September 27, 2005 || Kitt Peak || Spacewatch || — || align=right data-sort-value="0.69" | 690 m || 
|-id=218 bgcolor=#d6d6d6
| 444218 ||  || — || October 7, 2005 || Kitt Peak || Spacewatch || KOR || align=right | 1.4 km || 
|-id=219 bgcolor=#d6d6d6
| 444219 ||  || — || October 7, 2005 || Kitt Peak || Spacewatch || KOR || align=right | 1.2 km || 
|-id=220 bgcolor=#d6d6d6
| 444220 ||  || — || September 29, 2005 || Mount Lemmon || Mount Lemmon Survey || — || align=right | 1.9 km || 
|-id=221 bgcolor=#fefefe
| 444221 ||  || — || September 25, 2005 || Kitt Peak || Spacewatch || — || align=right data-sort-value="0.66" | 660 m || 
|-id=222 bgcolor=#d6d6d6
| 444222 ||  || — || October 1, 2005 || Kitt Peak || Spacewatch || EOS || align=right | 1.6 km || 
|-id=223 bgcolor=#d6d6d6
| 444223 ||  || — || October 6, 2005 || Mount Lemmon || Mount Lemmon Survey || — || align=right | 3.0 km || 
|-id=224 bgcolor=#d6d6d6
| 444224 ||  || — || October 10, 2005 || Catalina || CSS || — || align=right | 3.0 km || 
|-id=225 bgcolor=#FA8072
| 444225 ||  || — || October 27, 2005 || Socorro || LINEAR || H || align=right data-sort-value="0.62" | 620 m || 
|-id=226 bgcolor=#fefefe
| 444226 ||  || — || October 22, 2005 || Kitt Peak || Spacewatch || H || align=right data-sort-value="0.74" | 740 m || 
|-id=227 bgcolor=#d6d6d6
| 444227 ||  || — || October 24, 2005 || Kitt Peak || Spacewatch || — || align=right | 3.3 km || 
|-id=228 bgcolor=#d6d6d6
| 444228 ||  || — || October 22, 2005 || Kitt Peak || Spacewatch || — || align=right | 2.7 km || 
|-id=229 bgcolor=#fefefe
| 444229 ||  || — || October 22, 2005 || Catalina || CSS || — || align=right data-sort-value="0.72" | 720 m || 
|-id=230 bgcolor=#fefefe
| 444230 ||  || — || October 10, 2005 || Catalina || CSS || — || align=right data-sort-value="0.67" | 670 m || 
|-id=231 bgcolor=#d6d6d6
| 444231 ||  || — || October 23, 2005 || Palomar || NEAT || — || align=right | 2.2 km || 
|-id=232 bgcolor=#d6d6d6
| 444232 ||  || — || October 22, 2005 || Kitt Peak || Spacewatch || EOS || align=right | 1.5 km || 
|-id=233 bgcolor=#d6d6d6
| 444233 ||  || — || October 22, 2005 || Kitt Peak || Spacewatch || — || align=right | 2.0 km || 
|-id=234 bgcolor=#d6d6d6
| 444234 ||  || — || October 22, 2005 || Kitt Peak || Spacewatch || — || align=right | 2.5 km || 
|-id=235 bgcolor=#d6d6d6
| 444235 ||  || — || October 22, 2005 || Kitt Peak || Spacewatch || — || align=right | 2.1 km || 
|-id=236 bgcolor=#fefefe
| 444236 ||  || — || October 22, 2005 || Kitt Peak || Spacewatch || — || align=right data-sort-value="0.58" | 580 m || 
|-id=237 bgcolor=#d6d6d6
| 444237 ||  || — || October 22, 2005 || Kitt Peak || Spacewatch || — || align=right | 1.8 km || 
|-id=238 bgcolor=#fefefe
| 444238 ||  || — || October 24, 2005 || Kitt Peak || Spacewatch || — || align=right data-sort-value="0.67" | 670 m || 
|-id=239 bgcolor=#fefefe
| 444239 ||  || — || October 25, 2005 || Kitt Peak || Spacewatch || — || align=right data-sort-value="0.68" | 680 m || 
|-id=240 bgcolor=#d6d6d6
| 444240 ||  || — || October 25, 2005 || Kitt Peak || Spacewatch || — || align=right | 1.9 km || 
|-id=241 bgcolor=#d6d6d6
| 444241 ||  || — || October 26, 2005 || Kitt Peak || Spacewatch || — || align=right | 2.2 km || 
|-id=242 bgcolor=#fefefe
| 444242 ||  || — || October 26, 2005 || Kitt Peak || Spacewatch || — || align=right data-sort-value="0.58" | 580 m || 
|-id=243 bgcolor=#d6d6d6
| 444243 ||  || — || October 26, 2005 || Kitt Peak || Spacewatch || — || align=right | 2.0 km || 
|-id=244 bgcolor=#d6d6d6
| 444244 ||  || — || October 26, 2005 || Kitt Peak || Spacewatch || — || align=right | 2.7 km || 
|-id=245 bgcolor=#fefefe
| 444245 ||  || — || October 25, 2005 || Catalina || CSS || H || align=right data-sort-value="0.78" | 780 m || 
|-id=246 bgcolor=#fefefe
| 444246 ||  || — || October 24, 2005 || Kitt Peak || Spacewatch || (2076) || align=right data-sort-value="0.68" | 680 m || 
|-id=247 bgcolor=#d6d6d6
| 444247 ||  || — || October 24, 2005 || Kitt Peak || Spacewatch || — || align=right | 3.3 km || 
|-id=248 bgcolor=#d6d6d6
| 444248 ||  || — || October 24, 2005 || Kitt Peak || Spacewatch || EOS || align=right | 1.8 km || 
|-id=249 bgcolor=#d6d6d6
| 444249 ||  || — || October 24, 2005 || Kitt Peak || Spacewatch || EOS || align=right | 1.6 km || 
|-id=250 bgcolor=#fefefe
| 444250 ||  || — || October 25, 2005 || Mount Lemmon || Mount Lemmon Survey || — || align=right data-sort-value="0.49" | 490 m || 
|-id=251 bgcolor=#d6d6d6
| 444251 ||  || — || October 27, 2005 || Mount Lemmon || Mount Lemmon Survey || — || align=right | 2.9 km || 
|-id=252 bgcolor=#d6d6d6
| 444252 ||  || — || September 29, 2005 || Mount Lemmon || Mount Lemmon Survey || — || align=right | 2.1 km || 
|-id=253 bgcolor=#d6d6d6
| 444253 ||  || — || October 24, 2005 || Kitt Peak || Spacewatch || KOR || align=right | 1.4 km || 
|-id=254 bgcolor=#d6d6d6
| 444254 ||  || — || October 27, 2005 || Kitt Peak || Spacewatch || — || align=right | 1.8 km || 
|-id=255 bgcolor=#d6d6d6
| 444255 ||  || — || October 27, 2005 || Kitt Peak || Spacewatch || — || align=right | 2.6 km || 
|-id=256 bgcolor=#d6d6d6
| 444256 ||  || — || October 25, 2005 || Kitt Peak || Spacewatch || — || align=right | 2.3 km || 
|-id=257 bgcolor=#fefefe
| 444257 ||  || — || October 25, 2005 || Kitt Peak || Spacewatch || — || align=right data-sort-value="0.65" | 650 m || 
|-id=258 bgcolor=#fefefe
| 444258 ||  || — || October 25, 2005 || Mount Lemmon || Mount Lemmon Survey || — || align=right data-sort-value="0.61" | 610 m || 
|-id=259 bgcolor=#d6d6d6
| 444259 ||  || — || October 25, 2005 || Kitt Peak || Spacewatch || — || align=right | 2.0 km || 
|-id=260 bgcolor=#fefefe
| 444260 ||  || — || October 25, 2005 || Kitt Peak || Spacewatch || — || align=right data-sort-value="0.68" | 680 m || 
|-id=261 bgcolor=#fefefe
| 444261 ||  || — || October 25, 2005 || Kitt Peak || Spacewatch || — || align=right data-sort-value="0.69" | 690 m || 
|-id=262 bgcolor=#fefefe
| 444262 ||  || — || October 25, 2005 || Kitt Peak || Spacewatch || — || align=right data-sort-value="0.90" | 900 m || 
|-id=263 bgcolor=#d6d6d6
| 444263 ||  || — || October 25, 2005 || Kitt Peak || Spacewatch || — || align=right | 1.6 km || 
|-id=264 bgcolor=#d6d6d6
| 444264 ||  || — || October 27, 2005 || Kitt Peak || Spacewatch || — || align=right | 1.5 km || 
|-id=265 bgcolor=#d6d6d6
| 444265 ||  || — || October 1, 2005 || Kitt Peak || Spacewatch || — || align=right | 2.1 km || 
|-id=266 bgcolor=#d6d6d6
| 444266 ||  || — || October 26, 2005 || Kitt Peak || Spacewatch || — || align=right | 2.1 km || 
|-id=267 bgcolor=#d6d6d6
| 444267 ||  || — || October 26, 2005 || Kitt Peak || Spacewatch || — || align=right | 2.1 km || 
|-id=268 bgcolor=#d6d6d6
| 444268 ||  || — || October 26, 2005 || Kitt Peak || Spacewatch || EOS || align=right | 1.6 km || 
|-id=269 bgcolor=#d6d6d6
| 444269 ||  || — || October 29, 2005 || Mount Lemmon || Mount Lemmon Survey || — || align=right | 1.9 km || 
|-id=270 bgcolor=#fefefe
| 444270 ||  || — || October 27, 2005 || Kitt Peak || Spacewatch || — || align=right data-sort-value="0.68" | 680 m || 
|-id=271 bgcolor=#fefefe
| 444271 ||  || — || October 11, 2005 || Kitt Peak || Spacewatch || — || align=right data-sort-value="0.68" | 680 m || 
|-id=272 bgcolor=#d6d6d6
| 444272 ||  || — || October 1, 2005 || Mount Lemmon || Mount Lemmon Survey || — || align=right | 1.9 km || 
|-id=273 bgcolor=#d6d6d6
| 444273 ||  || — || October 29, 2005 || Mount Lemmon || Mount Lemmon Survey || — || align=right | 1.8 km || 
|-id=274 bgcolor=#d6d6d6
| 444274 ||  || — || October 30, 2005 || Socorro || LINEAR || — || align=right | 2.9 km || 
|-id=275 bgcolor=#d6d6d6
| 444275 ||  || — || October 30, 2005 || Mount Lemmon || Mount Lemmon Survey || — || align=right | 2.5 km || 
|-id=276 bgcolor=#d6d6d6
| 444276 ||  || — || October 27, 2005 || Mount Lemmon || Mount Lemmon Survey || — || align=right | 4.2 km || 
|-id=277 bgcolor=#d6d6d6
| 444277 ||  || — || October 30, 2005 || Mount Lemmon || Mount Lemmon Survey || — || align=right | 2.1 km || 
|-id=278 bgcolor=#d6d6d6
| 444278 ||  || — || October 27, 2005 || Kitt Peak || Spacewatch || EOS || align=right | 1.9 km || 
|-id=279 bgcolor=#d6d6d6
| 444279 ||  || — || October 28, 2005 || Kitt Peak || Spacewatch || — || align=right | 2.4 km || 
|-id=280 bgcolor=#d6d6d6
| 444280 ||  || — || October 28, 2005 || Kitt Peak || Spacewatch || — || align=right | 1.9 km || 
|-id=281 bgcolor=#d6d6d6
| 444281 ||  || — || October 28, 2005 || Kitt Peak || Spacewatch || — || align=right | 2.8 km || 
|-id=282 bgcolor=#d6d6d6
| 444282 ||  || — || October 28, 2005 || Kitt Peak || Spacewatch || — || align=right | 2.3 km || 
|-id=283 bgcolor=#d6d6d6
| 444283 ||  || — || October 31, 2005 || Kitt Peak || Spacewatch || EOS || align=right | 1.6 km || 
|-id=284 bgcolor=#fefefe
| 444284 ||  || — || October 29, 2005 || Catalina || CSS || — || align=right data-sort-value="0.91" | 910 m || 
|-id=285 bgcolor=#d6d6d6
| 444285 ||  || — || October 29, 2005 || Catalina || CSS || — || align=right | 2.6 km || 
|-id=286 bgcolor=#d6d6d6
| 444286 ||  || — || October 28, 2005 || Mount Lemmon || Mount Lemmon Survey || — || align=right | 2.2 km || 
|-id=287 bgcolor=#d6d6d6
| 444287 ||  || — || October 30, 2005 || Kitt Peak || Spacewatch || — || align=right | 2.5 km || 
|-id=288 bgcolor=#d6d6d6
| 444288 ||  || — || October 30, 2005 || Mount Lemmon || Mount Lemmon Survey || — || align=right | 2.5 km || 
|-id=289 bgcolor=#fefefe
| 444289 ||  || — || October 23, 2005 || Catalina || CSS || — || align=right data-sort-value="0.68" | 680 m || 
|-id=290 bgcolor=#d6d6d6
| 444290 ||  || — || October 23, 2005 || Catalina || CSS || — || align=right | 2.8 km || 
|-id=291 bgcolor=#d6d6d6
| 444291 ||  || — || October 26, 2005 || Anderson Mesa || LONEOS || EOS || align=right | 2.3 km || 
|-id=292 bgcolor=#d6d6d6
| 444292 ||  || — || October 27, 2005 || Mount Lemmon || Mount Lemmon Survey || EOS || align=right | 1.5 km || 
|-id=293 bgcolor=#d6d6d6
| 444293 ||  || — || October 27, 2005 || Mount Lemmon || Mount Lemmon Survey || THM || align=right | 1.7 km || 
|-id=294 bgcolor=#fefefe
| 444294 ||  || — || October 27, 2005 || Kitt Peak || Spacewatch || — || align=right data-sort-value="0.76" | 760 m || 
|-id=295 bgcolor=#d6d6d6
| 444295 ||  || — || October 22, 2005 || Apache Point || A. C. Becker || — || align=right | 2.8 km || 
|-id=296 bgcolor=#d6d6d6
| 444296 ||  || — || October 25, 2005 || Apache Point || A. C. Becker || — || align=right | 2.3 km || 
|-id=297 bgcolor=#d6d6d6
| 444297 ||  || — || October 25, 2005 || Kitt Peak || Spacewatch || — || align=right | 2.0 km || 
|-id=298 bgcolor=#fefefe
| 444298 ||  || — || October 30, 2005 || Mount Lemmon || Mount Lemmon Survey || critical || align=right data-sort-value="0.49" | 490 m || 
|-id=299 bgcolor=#d6d6d6
| 444299 ||  || — || September 30, 2005 || Mount Lemmon || Mount Lemmon Survey || — || align=right | 2.3 km || 
|-id=300 bgcolor=#d6d6d6
| 444300 ||  || — || October 31, 2005 || Mount Lemmon || Mount Lemmon Survey || — || align=right | 3.1 km || 
|}

444301–444400 

|-bgcolor=#d6d6d6
| 444301 ||  || — || October 29, 2005 || Kitt Peak || Spacewatch || — || align=right | 1.6 km || 
|-id=302 bgcolor=#d6d6d6
| 444302 ||  || — || November 1, 2005 || Mount Lemmon || Mount Lemmon Survey || — || align=right | 2.7 km || 
|-id=303 bgcolor=#fefefe
| 444303 ||  || — || October 22, 2005 || Kitt Peak || Spacewatch || — || align=right data-sort-value="0.88" | 880 m || 
|-id=304 bgcolor=#d6d6d6
| 444304 ||  || — || November 1, 2005 || Mount Lemmon || Mount Lemmon Survey || — || align=right | 2.2 km || 
|-id=305 bgcolor=#d6d6d6
| 444305 ||  || — || November 4, 2005 || Kitt Peak || Spacewatch || — || align=right | 3.3 km || 
|-id=306 bgcolor=#d6d6d6
| 444306 ||  || — || October 25, 2005 || Mount Lemmon || Mount Lemmon Survey || — || align=right | 3.0 km || 
|-id=307 bgcolor=#fefefe
| 444307 ||  || — || November 6, 2005 || Mount Lemmon || Mount Lemmon Survey || — || align=right data-sort-value="0.75" | 750 m || 
|-id=308 bgcolor=#d6d6d6
| 444308 ||  || — || November 6, 2005 || Mount Lemmon || Mount Lemmon Survey || — || align=right | 2.6 km || 
|-id=309 bgcolor=#d6d6d6
| 444309 ||  || — || November 10, 2005 || Catalina || CSS || — || align=right | 2.5 km || 
|-id=310 bgcolor=#fefefe
| 444310 ||  || — || November 2, 2005 || Mount Lemmon || Mount Lemmon Survey || — || align=right data-sort-value="0.80" | 800 m || 
|-id=311 bgcolor=#d6d6d6
| 444311 ||  || — || October 10, 2005 || Kitt Peak || Spacewatch || — || align=right | 2.3 km || 
|-id=312 bgcolor=#d6d6d6
| 444312 ||  || — || November 5, 2005 || Kitt Peak || Spacewatch || — || align=right | 2.0 km || 
|-id=313 bgcolor=#fefefe
| 444313 ||  || — || September 30, 2005 || Mount Lemmon || Mount Lemmon Survey || — || align=right data-sort-value="0.62" | 620 m || 
|-id=314 bgcolor=#d6d6d6
| 444314 ||  || — || November 6, 2005 || Mount Lemmon || Mount Lemmon Survey || — || align=right | 4.4 km || 
|-id=315 bgcolor=#d6d6d6
| 444315 ||  || — || November 4, 2005 || Kitt Peak || Spacewatch || — || align=right | 3.1 km || 
|-id=316 bgcolor=#d6d6d6
| 444316 ||  || — || November 1, 2005 || Mount Lemmon || Mount Lemmon Survey || TEL || align=right | 1.3 km || 
|-id=317 bgcolor=#fefefe
| 444317 ||  || — || October 25, 2005 || Mount Lemmon || Mount Lemmon Survey || — || align=right data-sort-value="0.63" | 630 m || 
|-id=318 bgcolor=#d6d6d6
| 444318 ||  || — || November 22, 2005 || Kitt Peak || Spacewatch || — || align=right | 3.1 km || 
|-id=319 bgcolor=#d6d6d6
| 444319 ||  || — || November 22, 2005 || Kitt Peak || Spacewatch || — || align=right | 2.4 km || 
|-id=320 bgcolor=#fefefe
| 444320 ||  || — || November 22, 2005 || Kitt Peak || Spacewatch || — || align=right data-sort-value="0.62" | 620 m || 
|-id=321 bgcolor=#d6d6d6
| 444321 ||  || — || November 12, 2005 || Kitt Peak || Spacewatch || — || align=right | 2.4 km || 
|-id=322 bgcolor=#fefefe
| 444322 ||  || — || November 21, 2005 || Kitt Peak || Spacewatch || — || align=right data-sort-value="0.62" | 620 m || 
|-id=323 bgcolor=#fefefe
| 444323 ||  || — || September 30, 2005 || Mount Lemmon || Mount Lemmon Survey || V || align=right data-sort-value="0.60" | 600 m || 
|-id=324 bgcolor=#fefefe
| 444324 ||  || — || November 21, 2005 || Kitt Peak || Spacewatch || — || align=right data-sort-value="0.57" | 570 m || 
|-id=325 bgcolor=#fefefe
| 444325 ||  || — || November 21, 2005 || Kitt Peak || Spacewatch || — || align=right data-sort-value="0.62" | 620 m || 
|-id=326 bgcolor=#FA8072
| 444326 ||  || — || November 22, 2005 || Kitt Peak || Spacewatch || — || align=right data-sort-value="0.75" | 750 m || 
|-id=327 bgcolor=#d6d6d6
| 444327 ||  || — || November 22, 2005 || Junk Bond || D. Healy || — || align=right | 2.2 km || 
|-id=328 bgcolor=#fefefe
| 444328 ||  || — || November 25, 2005 || Mount Lemmon || Mount Lemmon Survey || — || align=right data-sort-value="0.85" | 850 m || 
|-id=329 bgcolor=#d6d6d6
| 444329 ||  || — || October 27, 2005 || Mount Lemmon || Mount Lemmon Survey || — || align=right | 2.2 km || 
|-id=330 bgcolor=#d6d6d6
| 444330 ||  || — || November 25, 2005 || Kitt Peak || Spacewatch || EOS || align=right | 1.9 km || 
|-id=331 bgcolor=#fefefe
| 444331 ||  || — || November 21, 2005 || Catalina || CSS || — || align=right data-sort-value="0.66" | 660 m || 
|-id=332 bgcolor=#d6d6d6
| 444332 ||  || — || October 25, 2005 || Kitt Peak || Spacewatch || — || align=right | 2.1 km || 
|-id=333 bgcolor=#d6d6d6
| 444333 ||  || — || November 26, 2005 || Mount Lemmon || Mount Lemmon Survey || — || align=right | 2.5 km || 
|-id=334 bgcolor=#fefefe
| 444334 ||  || — || November 22, 2005 || Catalina || CSS || — || align=right data-sort-value="0.62" | 620 m || 
|-id=335 bgcolor=#d6d6d6
| 444335 ||  || — || November 26, 2005 || Mount Lemmon || Mount Lemmon Survey || — || align=right | 3.1 km || 
|-id=336 bgcolor=#d6d6d6
| 444336 ||  || — || November 28, 2005 || Mount Lemmon || Mount Lemmon Survey || — || align=right | 5.0 km || 
|-id=337 bgcolor=#d6d6d6
| 444337 ||  || — || October 22, 2005 || Kitt Peak || Spacewatch || EOS || align=right | 2.2 km || 
|-id=338 bgcolor=#d6d6d6
| 444338 ||  || — || November 26, 2005 || Kitt Peak || Spacewatch || — || align=right | 2.1 km || 
|-id=339 bgcolor=#fefefe
| 444339 ||  || — || November 30, 2005 || Kitt Peak || Spacewatch || — || align=right data-sort-value="0.79" | 790 m || 
|-id=340 bgcolor=#fefefe
| 444340 ||  || — || November 30, 2005 || Mount Lemmon || Mount Lemmon Survey || — || align=right | 1.2 km || 
|-id=341 bgcolor=#d6d6d6
| 444341 ||  || — || November 25, 2005 || Catalina || CSS || — || align=right | 2.8 km || 
|-id=342 bgcolor=#d6d6d6
| 444342 ||  || — || November 28, 2005 || Catalina || CSS || EOS || align=right | 4.9 km || 
|-id=343 bgcolor=#d6d6d6
| 444343 ||  || — || November 12, 2005 || Kitt Peak || Spacewatch || — || align=right | 2.2 km || 
|-id=344 bgcolor=#d6d6d6
| 444344 ||  || — || November 25, 2005 || Mount Lemmon || Mount Lemmon Survey || — || align=right | 2.7 km || 
|-id=345 bgcolor=#d6d6d6
| 444345 ||  || — || October 25, 2005 || Mount Lemmon || Mount Lemmon Survey || — || align=right | 2.0 km || 
|-id=346 bgcolor=#d6d6d6
| 444346 ||  || — || November 26, 2005 || Mount Lemmon || Mount Lemmon Survey || — || align=right | 1.9 km || 
|-id=347 bgcolor=#d6d6d6
| 444347 ||  || — || November 28, 2005 || Mount Lemmon || Mount Lemmon Survey || — || align=right | 2.9 km || 
|-id=348 bgcolor=#d6d6d6
| 444348 ||  || — || November 6, 2005 || Mount Lemmon || Mount Lemmon Survey || — || align=right | 1.9 km || 
|-id=349 bgcolor=#d6d6d6
| 444349 ||  || — || October 28, 2005 || Mount Lemmon || Mount Lemmon Survey || THM || align=right | 1.8 km || 
|-id=350 bgcolor=#d6d6d6
| 444350 ||  || — || November 29, 2005 || Kitt Peak || Spacewatch || EOS || align=right | 1.6 km || 
|-id=351 bgcolor=#fefefe
| 444351 ||  || — || November 29, 2005 || Palomar || NEAT || — || align=right data-sort-value="0.66" | 660 m || 
|-id=352 bgcolor=#d6d6d6
| 444352 ||  || — || November 28, 2005 || Socorro || LINEAR || — || align=right | 3.9 km || 
|-id=353 bgcolor=#d6d6d6
| 444353 ||  || — || November 30, 2005 || Kitt Peak || Spacewatch || — || align=right | 2.8 km || 
|-id=354 bgcolor=#d6d6d6
| 444354 ||  || — || November 5, 2005 || Kitt Peak || Spacewatch || — || align=right | 3.4 km || 
|-id=355 bgcolor=#d6d6d6
| 444355 ||  || — || December 1, 2005 || Kitt Peak || Spacewatch || — || align=right | 3.2 km || 
|-id=356 bgcolor=#d6d6d6
| 444356 ||  || — || November 22, 2005 || Kitt Peak || Spacewatch || EOS || align=right | 1.6 km || 
|-id=357 bgcolor=#d6d6d6
| 444357 ||  || — || December 1, 2005 || Kitt Peak || Spacewatch || EOS || align=right | 2.1 km || 
|-id=358 bgcolor=#d6d6d6
| 444358 ||  || — || December 2, 2005 || Mount Lemmon || Mount Lemmon Survey || — || align=right | 3.3 km || 
|-id=359 bgcolor=#d6d6d6
| 444359 ||  || — || December 4, 2005 || Mount Lemmon || Mount Lemmon Survey || — || align=right | 1.9 km || 
|-id=360 bgcolor=#d6d6d6
| 444360 ||  || — || October 9, 1994 || Kitt Peak || Spacewatch || — || align=right | 2.1 km || 
|-id=361 bgcolor=#d6d6d6
| 444361 ||  || — || October 27, 2005 || Mount Lemmon || Mount Lemmon Survey || — || align=right | 2.6 km || 
|-id=362 bgcolor=#d6d6d6
| 444362 ||  || — || October 28, 2005 || Mount Lemmon || Mount Lemmon Survey || — || align=right | 3.5 km || 
|-id=363 bgcolor=#d6d6d6
| 444363 ||  || — || December 2, 2005 || Kitt Peak || Spacewatch || — || align=right | 2.2 km || 
|-id=364 bgcolor=#fefefe
| 444364 ||  || — || December 2, 2005 || Kitt Peak || Spacewatch || — || align=right data-sort-value="0.90" | 900 m || 
|-id=365 bgcolor=#d6d6d6
| 444365 ||  || — || December 4, 2005 || Kitt Peak || Spacewatch || THM || align=right | 1.7 km || 
|-id=366 bgcolor=#d6d6d6
| 444366 ||  || — || December 6, 2005 || Kitt Peak || Spacewatch || — || align=right | 2.8 km || 
|-id=367 bgcolor=#fefefe
| 444367 ||  || — || December 8, 2005 || Kitt Peak || Spacewatch || — || align=right data-sort-value="0.57" | 570 m || 
|-id=368 bgcolor=#fefefe
| 444368 ||  || — || October 19, 1998 || Kitt Peak || Spacewatch || — || align=right data-sort-value="0.62" | 620 m || 
|-id=369 bgcolor=#d6d6d6
| 444369 ||  || — || December 21, 2005 || Catalina || CSS || — || align=right | 4.6 km || 
|-id=370 bgcolor=#d6d6d6
| 444370 ||  || — || December 5, 2005 || Kitt Peak || Spacewatch || EOS || align=right | 2.3 km || 
|-id=371 bgcolor=#d6d6d6
| 444371 ||  || — || December 24, 2005 || Kitt Peak || Spacewatch || — || align=right | 3.4 km || 
|-id=372 bgcolor=#d6d6d6
| 444372 ||  || — || December 25, 2005 || Mount Lemmon || Mount Lemmon Survey || LIX || align=right | 3.5 km || 
|-id=373 bgcolor=#fefefe
| 444373 ||  || — || December 25, 2005 || Kitt Peak || Spacewatch || — || align=right data-sort-value="0.55" | 550 m || 
|-id=374 bgcolor=#fefefe
| 444374 ||  || — || December 26, 2005 || Kitt Peak || Spacewatch || — || align=right data-sort-value="0.78" | 780 m || 
|-id=375 bgcolor=#d6d6d6
| 444375 ||  || — || December 26, 2005 || Kitt Peak || Spacewatch || — || align=right | 2.3 km || 
|-id=376 bgcolor=#d6d6d6
| 444376 ||  || — || November 29, 2005 || Mount Lemmon || Mount Lemmon Survey || — || align=right | 3.8 km || 
|-id=377 bgcolor=#fefefe
| 444377 ||  || — || December 24, 2005 || Kitt Peak || Spacewatch || — || align=right data-sort-value="0.59" | 590 m || 
|-id=378 bgcolor=#d6d6d6
| 444378 ||  || — || December 2, 2005 || Mount Lemmon || Mount Lemmon Survey || — || align=right | 2.2 km || 
|-id=379 bgcolor=#fefefe
| 444379 ||  || — || December 27, 2005 || Mount Lemmon || Mount Lemmon Survey || — || align=right data-sort-value="0.65" | 650 m || 
|-id=380 bgcolor=#d6d6d6
| 444380 ||  || — || December 28, 2005 || Kitt Peak || Spacewatch || — || align=right | 2.6 km || 
|-id=381 bgcolor=#d6d6d6
| 444381 ||  || — || December 25, 2005 || Kitt Peak || Spacewatch || — || align=right | 2.6 km || 
|-id=382 bgcolor=#fefefe
| 444382 ||  || — || December 25, 2005 || Kitt Peak || Spacewatch || MAS || align=right data-sort-value="0.71" | 710 m || 
|-id=383 bgcolor=#d6d6d6
| 444383 ||  || — || December 26, 2005 || Mount Lemmon || Mount Lemmon Survey || — || align=right | 3.8 km || 
|-id=384 bgcolor=#d6d6d6
| 444384 ||  || — || December 26, 2005 || Kitt Peak || Spacewatch || — || align=right | 2.8 km || 
|-id=385 bgcolor=#fefefe
| 444385 ||  || — || December 26, 2005 || Kitt Peak || Spacewatch || — || align=right data-sort-value="0.85" | 850 m || 
|-id=386 bgcolor=#fefefe
| 444386 ||  || — || December 25, 2005 || Kitt Peak || Spacewatch || — || align=right data-sort-value="0.97" | 970 m || 
|-id=387 bgcolor=#d6d6d6
| 444387 ||  || — || November 30, 2005 || Mount Lemmon || Mount Lemmon Survey || — || align=right | 3.8 km || 
|-id=388 bgcolor=#fefefe
| 444388 ||  || — || December 22, 2005 || Kitt Peak || Spacewatch || MAS || align=right data-sort-value="0.65" | 650 m || 
|-id=389 bgcolor=#fefefe
| 444389 ||  || — || December 28, 2005 || Mount Lemmon || Mount Lemmon Survey || — || align=right data-sort-value="0.45" | 450 m || 
|-id=390 bgcolor=#fefefe
| 444390 ||  || — || November 30, 2005 || Mount Lemmon || Mount Lemmon Survey || ERI || align=right | 1.2 km || 
|-id=391 bgcolor=#fefefe
| 444391 ||  || — || December 30, 2005 || Kitt Peak || Spacewatch || — || align=right data-sort-value="0.59" | 590 m || 
|-id=392 bgcolor=#d6d6d6
| 444392 ||  || — || December 24, 2005 || Kitt Peak || Spacewatch || — || align=right | 2.1 km || 
|-id=393 bgcolor=#fefefe
| 444393 ||  || — || November 28, 2005 || Mount Lemmon || Mount Lemmon Survey || — || align=right data-sort-value="0.83" | 830 m || 
|-id=394 bgcolor=#d6d6d6
| 444394 ||  || — || December 1, 2005 || Mount Lemmon || Mount Lemmon Survey || — || align=right | 2.9 km || 
|-id=395 bgcolor=#d6d6d6
| 444395 ||  || — || December 30, 2005 || Kitt Peak || Spacewatch || THM || align=right | 2.3 km || 
|-id=396 bgcolor=#d6d6d6
| 444396 ||  || — || December 29, 2005 || Kitt Peak || Spacewatch || — || align=right | 3.0 km || 
|-id=397 bgcolor=#d6d6d6
| 444397 ||  || — || December 10, 2005 || Kitt Peak || Spacewatch || — || align=right | 3.2 km || 
|-id=398 bgcolor=#fefefe
| 444398 ||  || — || December 25, 2005 || Kitt Peak || Spacewatch || — || align=right data-sort-value="0.55" | 550 m || 
|-id=399 bgcolor=#fefefe
| 444399 ||  || — || December 26, 2005 || Mount Lemmon || Mount Lemmon Survey || — || align=right data-sort-value="0.92" | 920 m || 
|-id=400 bgcolor=#d6d6d6
| 444400 ||  || — || December 30, 2005 || Kitt Peak || Spacewatch || THM || align=right | 1.6 km || 
|}

444401–444500 

|-bgcolor=#fefefe
| 444401 ||  || — || December 6, 2005 || Kitt Peak || Spacewatch || — || align=right data-sort-value="0.85" | 850 m || 
|-id=402 bgcolor=#d6d6d6
| 444402 ||  || — || January 7, 2006 || Anderson Mesa || LONEOS || — || align=right | 4.7 km || 
|-id=403 bgcolor=#fefefe
| 444403 ||  || — || January 2, 2006 || Mount Lemmon || Mount Lemmon Survey || — || align=right data-sort-value="0.61" | 610 m || 
|-id=404 bgcolor=#d6d6d6
| 444404 ||  || — || January 5, 2006 || Catalina || CSS || — || align=right | 3.7 km || 
|-id=405 bgcolor=#d6d6d6
| 444405 ||  || — || January 5, 2006 || Catalina || CSS || TIR || align=right | 2.8 km || 
|-id=406 bgcolor=#fefefe
| 444406 ||  || — || December 25, 2005 || Mount Lemmon || Mount Lemmon Survey || — || align=right data-sort-value="0.63" | 630 m || 
|-id=407 bgcolor=#fefefe
| 444407 ||  || — || January 4, 2006 || Mount Lemmon || Mount Lemmon Survey || MAS || align=right data-sort-value="0.62" | 620 m || 
|-id=408 bgcolor=#d6d6d6
| 444408 ||  || — || January 5, 2006 || Mount Lemmon || Mount Lemmon Survey || — || align=right | 2.9 km || 
|-id=409 bgcolor=#fefefe
| 444409 ||  || — || January 6, 2006 || Kitt Peak || Spacewatch || — || align=right data-sort-value="0.55" | 550 m || 
|-id=410 bgcolor=#d6d6d6
| 444410 ||  || — || December 2, 2005 || Kitt Peak || Spacewatch || — || align=right | 4.3 km || 
|-id=411 bgcolor=#fefefe
| 444411 ||  || — || December 25, 2005 || Mount Lemmon || Mount Lemmon Survey || — || align=right data-sort-value="0.72" | 720 m || 
|-id=412 bgcolor=#fefefe
| 444412 ||  || — || January 5, 2006 || Kitt Peak || Spacewatch || V || align=right data-sort-value="0.62" | 620 m || 
|-id=413 bgcolor=#fefefe
| 444413 ||  || — || January 5, 2006 || Kitt Peak || Spacewatch || V || align=right data-sort-value="0.51" | 510 m || 
|-id=414 bgcolor=#d6d6d6
| 444414 ||  || — || December 29, 2005 || Mount Lemmon || Mount Lemmon Survey || — || align=right | 4.2 km || 
|-id=415 bgcolor=#fefefe
| 444415 ||  || — || January 8, 2006 || Kitt Peak || Spacewatch || — || align=right data-sort-value="0.86" | 860 m || 
|-id=416 bgcolor=#fefefe
| 444416 ||  || — || January 23, 2006 || Kitt Peak || Spacewatch || H || align=right data-sort-value="0.77" | 770 m || 
|-id=417 bgcolor=#d6d6d6
| 444417 ||  || — || December 30, 2005 || Kitt Peak || Spacewatch || HYG || align=right | 2.5 km || 
|-id=418 bgcolor=#d6d6d6
| 444418 ||  || — || November 25, 2005 || Mount Lemmon || Mount Lemmon Survey || — || align=right | 4.1 km || 
|-id=419 bgcolor=#d6d6d6
| 444419 ||  || — || January 10, 2006 || Mount Lemmon || Mount Lemmon Survey || — || align=right | 2.0 km || 
|-id=420 bgcolor=#fefefe
| 444420 ||  || — || January 23, 2006 || Kitt Peak || Spacewatch || — || align=right data-sort-value="0.62" | 620 m || 
|-id=421 bgcolor=#fefefe
| 444421 ||  || — || January 24, 2006 || Socorro || LINEAR || — || align=right data-sort-value="0.71" | 710 m || 
|-id=422 bgcolor=#fefefe
| 444422 ||  || — || January 25, 2006 || Kitt Peak || Spacewatch || MAS || align=right data-sort-value="0.63" | 630 m || 
|-id=423 bgcolor=#fefefe
| 444423 ||  || — || January 23, 2006 || Kitt Peak || Spacewatch || — || align=right data-sort-value="0.80" | 800 m || 
|-id=424 bgcolor=#fefefe
| 444424 ||  || — || January 23, 2006 || Kitt Peak || Spacewatch || MAS || align=right data-sort-value="0.65" | 650 m || 
|-id=425 bgcolor=#fefefe
| 444425 ||  || — || January 23, 2006 || Kitt Peak || Spacewatch || — || align=right data-sort-value="0.53" | 530 m || 
|-id=426 bgcolor=#fefefe
| 444426 ||  || — || January 23, 2006 || Kitt Peak || Spacewatch || — || align=right | 1.9 km || 
|-id=427 bgcolor=#fefefe
| 444427 ||  || — || January 25, 2006 || Kitt Peak || Spacewatch || — || align=right data-sort-value="0.68" | 680 m || 
|-id=428 bgcolor=#fefefe
| 444428 ||  || — || January 28, 2006 || Mount Lemmon || Mount Lemmon Survey || NYS || align=right data-sort-value="0.46" | 460 m || 
|-id=429 bgcolor=#fefefe
| 444429 ||  || — || January 21, 2006 || Mount Lemmon || Mount Lemmon Survey || NYS || align=right data-sort-value="0.67" | 670 m || 
|-id=430 bgcolor=#d6d6d6
| 444430 ||  || — || January 23, 2006 || Catalina || CSS || — || align=right | 2.8 km || 
|-id=431 bgcolor=#fefefe
| 444431 ||  || — || January 26, 2006 || Mount Lemmon || Mount Lemmon Survey || — || align=right data-sort-value="0.91" | 910 m || 
|-id=432 bgcolor=#fefefe
| 444432 ||  || — || January 27, 2006 || Mount Lemmon || Mount Lemmon Survey || — || align=right data-sort-value="0.70" | 700 m || 
|-id=433 bgcolor=#fefefe
| 444433 ||  || — || January 27, 2006 || Mount Lemmon || Mount Lemmon Survey || — || align=right data-sort-value="0.94" | 940 m || 
|-id=434 bgcolor=#fefefe
| 444434 ||  || — || January 28, 2006 || Mount Lemmon || Mount Lemmon Survey || — || align=right data-sort-value="0.54" | 540 m || 
|-id=435 bgcolor=#d6d6d6
| 444435 ||  || — || January 30, 2006 || Kitt Peak || Spacewatch || Tj (2.98) || align=right | 4.4 km || 
|-id=436 bgcolor=#d6d6d6
| 444436 ||  || — || January 31, 2006 || Kitt Peak || Spacewatch || — || align=right | 2.5 km || 
|-id=437 bgcolor=#fefefe
| 444437 ||  || — || January 31, 2006 || Kitt Peak || Spacewatch || NYS || align=right data-sort-value="0.73" | 730 m || 
|-id=438 bgcolor=#d6d6d6
| 444438 ||  || — || January 31, 2006 || Kitt Peak || Spacewatch || LIX || align=right | 2.7 km || 
|-id=439 bgcolor=#fefefe
| 444439 ||  || — || December 25, 2005 || Mount Lemmon || Mount Lemmon Survey || — || align=right data-sort-value="0.82" | 820 m || 
|-id=440 bgcolor=#fefefe
| 444440 ||  || — || January 31, 2006 || Kitt Peak || Spacewatch || MAS || align=right data-sort-value="0.71" | 710 m || 
|-id=441 bgcolor=#fefefe
| 444441 ||  || — || January 31, 2006 || Kitt Peak || Spacewatch || — || align=right data-sort-value="0.86" | 860 m || 
|-id=442 bgcolor=#fefefe
| 444442 ||  || — || January 31, 2006 || Kitt Peak || Spacewatch || NYS || align=right data-sort-value="0.51" | 510 m || 
|-id=443 bgcolor=#fefefe
| 444443 ||  || — || February 1, 2006 || Kitt Peak || Spacewatch || — || align=right data-sort-value="0.68" | 680 m || 
|-id=444 bgcolor=#fefefe
| 444444 ||  || — || February 4, 2006 || Mount Lemmon || Mount Lemmon Survey || NYS || align=right data-sort-value="0.60" | 600 m || 
|-id=445 bgcolor=#fefefe
| 444445 ||  || — || January 25, 2006 || Kitt Peak || Spacewatch || V || align=right data-sort-value="0.56" | 560 m || 
|-id=446 bgcolor=#fefefe
| 444446 ||  || — || January 6, 2006 || Catalina || CSS || H || align=right data-sort-value="0.75" | 750 m || 
|-id=447 bgcolor=#d6d6d6
| 444447 ||  || — || February 24, 2006 || Kitt Peak || Spacewatch || — || align=right | 3.3 km || 
|-id=448 bgcolor=#d6d6d6
| 444448 ||  || — || February 4, 2006 || Kitt Peak || Spacewatch || — || align=right | 3.2 km || 
|-id=449 bgcolor=#fefefe
| 444449 ||  || — || February 25, 2006 || Kitt Peak || Spacewatch || — || align=right data-sort-value="0.94" | 940 m || 
|-id=450 bgcolor=#fefefe
| 444450 ||  || — || February 25, 2006 || Kitt Peak || Spacewatch || — || align=right data-sort-value="0.74" | 740 m || 
|-id=451 bgcolor=#fefefe
| 444451 ||  || — || February 25, 2006 || Kitt Peak || Spacewatch || — || align=right data-sort-value="0.81" | 810 m || 
|-id=452 bgcolor=#fefefe
| 444452 ||  || — || February 27, 2006 || Kitt Peak || Spacewatch || H || align=right data-sort-value="0.65" | 650 m || 
|-id=453 bgcolor=#fefefe
| 444453 ||  || — || February 27, 2006 || Kitt Peak || Spacewatch || — || align=right | 2.3 km || 
|-id=454 bgcolor=#fefefe
| 444454 ||  || — || February 23, 2006 || Anderson Mesa || LONEOS || H || align=right data-sort-value="0.85" | 850 m || 
|-id=455 bgcolor=#fefefe
| 444455 ||  || — || February 25, 2006 || Mount Lemmon || Mount Lemmon Survey || — || align=right data-sort-value="0.62" | 620 m || 
|-id=456 bgcolor=#fefefe
| 444456 ||  || — || March 2, 2006 || Kitt Peak || Spacewatch || MAS || align=right data-sort-value="0.57" | 570 m || 
|-id=457 bgcolor=#fefefe
| 444457 ||  || — || March 3, 2006 || Kitt Peak || Spacewatch || — || align=right | 2.0 km || 
|-id=458 bgcolor=#fefefe
| 444458 ||  || — || March 3, 2006 || Kitt Peak || Spacewatch || MAS || align=right data-sort-value="0.67" | 670 m || 
|-id=459 bgcolor=#fefefe
| 444459 ||  || — || March 3, 2006 || Kitt Peak || Spacewatch || H || align=right data-sort-value="0.63" | 630 m || 
|-id=460 bgcolor=#d6d6d6
| 444460 ||  || — || March 4, 2006 || Kitt Peak || Spacewatch || THB || align=right | 3.8 km || 
|-id=461 bgcolor=#fefefe
| 444461 ||  || — || March 8, 2006 || Kitt Peak || Spacewatch || — || align=right | 1.1 km || 
|-id=462 bgcolor=#fefefe
| 444462 ||  || — || March 2, 2006 || Kitt Peak || M. W. Buie || CLA || align=right | 1.4 km || 
|-id=463 bgcolor=#fefefe
| 444463 ||  || — || March 2, 2006 || Kitt Peak || Spacewatch || — || align=right data-sort-value="0.71" | 710 m || 
|-id=464 bgcolor=#d6d6d6
| 444464 ||  || — || January 31, 2006 || Catalina || CSS || THB || align=right | 3.0 km || 
|-id=465 bgcolor=#fefefe
| 444465 ||  || — || January 22, 2006 || Catalina || CSS || H || align=right data-sort-value="0.68" | 680 m || 
|-id=466 bgcolor=#fefefe
| 444466 ||  || — || April 2, 2006 || Kitt Peak || Spacewatch || H || align=right data-sort-value="0.62" | 620 m || 
|-id=467 bgcolor=#fefefe
| 444467 ||  || — || April 20, 2006 || Kitt Peak || Spacewatch || H || align=right data-sort-value="0.74" | 740 m || 
|-id=468 bgcolor=#E9E9E9
| 444468 ||  || — || April 27, 2006 || Socorro || LINEAR || — || align=right | 2.4 km || 
|-id=469 bgcolor=#E9E9E9
| 444469 ||  || — || May 2, 2006 || Mount Lemmon || Mount Lemmon Survey || — || align=right data-sort-value="0.98" | 980 m || 
|-id=470 bgcolor=#E9E9E9
| 444470 ||  || — || May 20, 2006 || Kitt Peak || Spacewatch || — || align=right data-sort-value="0.94" | 940 m || 
|-id=471 bgcolor=#E9E9E9
| 444471 ||  || — || May 22, 2006 || Kitt Peak || Spacewatch || EUN || align=right data-sort-value="0.96" | 960 m || 
|-id=472 bgcolor=#E9E9E9
| 444472 ||  || — || May 29, 2006 || Socorro || LINEAR || — || align=right | 1.0 km || 
|-id=473 bgcolor=#E9E9E9
| 444473 ||  || — || May 28, 2006 || Kitt Peak || Spacewatch || — || align=right data-sort-value="0.94" | 940 m || 
|-id=474 bgcolor=#E9E9E9
| 444474 ||  || — || May 25, 2006 || Mauna Kea || P. A. Wiegert || — || align=right data-sort-value="0.67" | 670 m || 
|-id=475 bgcolor=#E9E9E9
| 444475 ||  || — || August 12, 2006 || Palomar || NEAT || EUN || align=right | 1.6 km || 
|-id=476 bgcolor=#E9E9E9
| 444476 ||  || — || August 15, 2006 || Palomar || NEAT || — || align=right | 2.4 km || 
|-id=477 bgcolor=#E9E9E9
| 444477 ||  || — || July 18, 2006 || Siding Spring || SSS || JUN || align=right | 1.0 km || 
|-id=478 bgcolor=#E9E9E9
| 444478 ||  || — || August 23, 2006 || Palomar || NEAT || — || align=right | 1.6 km || 
|-id=479 bgcolor=#E9E9E9
| 444479 ||  || — || August 21, 2006 || Kitt Peak || Spacewatch || — || align=right | 1.3 km || 
|-id=480 bgcolor=#E9E9E9
| 444480 ||  || — || August 28, 2006 || La Sagra || OAM Obs. || 526 || align=right | 2.3 km || 
|-id=481 bgcolor=#E9E9E9
| 444481 ||  || — || August 28, 2006 || Catalina || CSS || EUN || align=right | 1.1 km || 
|-id=482 bgcolor=#E9E9E9
| 444482 ||  || — || August 21, 2006 || Kitt Peak || Spacewatch || — || align=right | 2.6 km || 
|-id=483 bgcolor=#E9E9E9
| 444483 ||  || — || May 8, 2006 || Mount Lemmon || Mount Lemmon Survey || — || align=right | 1.6 km || 
|-id=484 bgcolor=#E9E9E9
| 444484 ||  || — || August 29, 2006 || Anderson Mesa || LONEOS || — || align=right | 1.6 km || 
|-id=485 bgcolor=#E9E9E9
| 444485 ||  || — || August 29, 2006 || Catalina || CSS || — || align=right | 1.6 km || 
|-id=486 bgcolor=#E9E9E9
| 444486 ||  || — || May 8, 2005 || Kitt Peak || Spacewatch || NEM || align=right | 2.0 km || 
|-id=487 bgcolor=#E9E9E9
| 444487 ||  || — || August 19, 2006 || Kitt Peak || Spacewatch || (5) || align=right data-sort-value="0.90" | 900 m || 
|-id=488 bgcolor=#E9E9E9
| 444488 ||  || — || August 28, 2006 || Kitt Peak || Spacewatch || HOF || align=right | 2.2 km || 
|-id=489 bgcolor=#E9E9E9
| 444489 ||  || — || August 28, 2006 || Catalina || CSS || — || align=right | 2.1 km || 
|-id=490 bgcolor=#E9E9E9
| 444490 ||  || — || September 12, 2006 || Socorro || LINEAR || JUN || align=right | 1.3 km || 
|-id=491 bgcolor=#E9E9E9
| 444491 ||  || — || September 12, 2006 || Catalina || CSS || — || align=right | 2.1 km || 
|-id=492 bgcolor=#E9E9E9
| 444492 ||  || — || August 29, 2006 || Anderson Mesa || LONEOS || JUN || align=right | 1.2 km || 
|-id=493 bgcolor=#E9E9E9
| 444493 ||  || — || September 15, 2006 || Kitt Peak || Spacewatch || — || align=right | 1.5 km || 
|-id=494 bgcolor=#E9E9E9
| 444494 ||  || — || September 15, 2006 || Kitt Peak || Spacewatch || — || align=right | 1.7 km || 
|-id=495 bgcolor=#E9E9E9
| 444495 ||  || — || September 15, 2006 || Goodricke-Pigott || R. A. Tucker || — || align=right | 2.1 km || 
|-id=496 bgcolor=#E9E9E9
| 444496 ||  || — || September 15, 2006 || Kitt Peak || Spacewatch || WIT || align=right data-sort-value="0.91" | 910 m || 
|-id=497 bgcolor=#E9E9E9
| 444497 ||  || — || September 14, 2006 || Kitt Peak || Spacewatch || HOFfast? || align=right | 2.2 km || 
|-id=498 bgcolor=#E9E9E9
| 444498 ||  || — || September 14, 2006 || Kitt Peak || Spacewatch || — || align=right | 2.3 km || 
|-id=499 bgcolor=#E9E9E9
| 444499 ||  || — || September 14, 2006 || Kitt Peak || Spacewatch || — || align=right | 1.6 km || 
|-id=500 bgcolor=#E9E9E9
| 444500 ||  || — || November 5, 2002 || Socorro || LINEAR || — || align=right | 1.2 km || 
|}

444501–444600 

|-bgcolor=#E9E9E9
| 444501 ||  || — || September 15, 2006 || Kitt Peak || Spacewatch || — || align=right | 1.6 km || 
|-id=502 bgcolor=#E9E9E9
| 444502 ||  || — || September 15, 2006 || Kitt Peak || Spacewatch || NEM || align=right | 2.1 km || 
|-id=503 bgcolor=#E9E9E9
| 444503 ||  || — || September 15, 2006 || Kitt Peak || Spacewatch || — || align=right | 2.5 km || 
|-id=504 bgcolor=#E9E9E9
| 444504 ||  || — || September 15, 2006 || Kitt Peak || Spacewatch || critical || align=right | 1.8 km || 
|-id=505 bgcolor=#E9E9E9
| 444505 ||  || — || September 15, 2006 || Kitt Peak || Spacewatch || AGN || align=right | 1.1 km || 
|-id=506 bgcolor=#E9E9E9
| 444506 ||  || — || September 16, 2006 || Catalina || CSS || EUN || align=right | 1.3 km || 
|-id=507 bgcolor=#E9E9E9
| 444507 ||  || — || September 17, 2006 || Kitt Peak || Spacewatch || — || align=right | 1.8 km || 
|-id=508 bgcolor=#E9E9E9
| 444508 ||  || — || September 16, 2006 || Catalina || CSS || — || align=right | 2.7 km || 
|-id=509 bgcolor=#E9E9E9
| 444509 ||  || — || August 29, 2006 || Kitt Peak || Spacewatch || CLOcritical || align=right | 1.3 km || 
|-id=510 bgcolor=#E9E9E9
| 444510 ||  || — || September 17, 2006 || Catalina || CSS || — || align=right | 2.0 km || 
|-id=511 bgcolor=#E9E9E9
| 444511 ||  || — || September 17, 2006 || Catalina || CSS || EUN || align=right | 1.6 km || 
|-id=512 bgcolor=#E9E9E9
| 444512 ||  || — || September 17, 2006 || Catalina || CSS || — || align=right | 2.8 km || 
|-id=513 bgcolor=#E9E9E9
| 444513 ||  || — || September 18, 2006 || Catalina || CSS || — || align=right | 1.6 km || 
|-id=514 bgcolor=#E9E9E9
| 444514 ||  || — || September 18, 2006 || Catalina || CSS || — || align=right | 1.9 km || 
|-id=515 bgcolor=#E9E9E9
| 444515 ||  || — || September 17, 2006 || Kitt Peak || Spacewatch || — || align=right | 2.2 km || 
|-id=516 bgcolor=#E9E9E9
| 444516 ||  || — || August 29, 2006 || Catalina || CSS || — || align=right | 1.8 km || 
|-id=517 bgcolor=#E9E9E9
| 444517 ||  || — || September 19, 2006 || Kitt Peak || Spacewatch || AGN || align=right | 1.0 km || 
|-id=518 bgcolor=#E9E9E9
| 444518 ||  || — || September 17, 2006 || Catalina || CSS || — || align=right | 2.7 km || 
|-id=519 bgcolor=#E9E9E9
| 444519 ||  || — || September 18, 2006 || Kitt Peak || Spacewatch || — || align=right | 1.8 km || 
|-id=520 bgcolor=#E9E9E9
| 444520 ||  || — || September 18, 2006 || Kitt Peak || Spacewatch || AGN || align=right | 1.1 km || 
|-id=521 bgcolor=#E9E9E9
| 444521 ||  || — || September 18, 2006 || Kitt Peak || Spacewatch || — || align=right | 1.8 km || 
|-id=522 bgcolor=#E9E9E9
| 444522 ||  || — || September 18, 2006 || Kitt Peak || Spacewatch || — || align=right | 2.0 km || 
|-id=523 bgcolor=#E9E9E9
| 444523 ||  || — || September 18, 2006 || Kitt Peak || Spacewatch || — || align=right | 1.7 km || 
|-id=524 bgcolor=#E9E9E9
| 444524 ||  || — || September 19, 2006 || Catalina || CSS || — || align=right | 2.6 km || 
|-id=525 bgcolor=#E9E9E9
| 444525 ||  || — || September 24, 2006 || Kitt Peak || Spacewatch || — || align=right | 1.8 km || 
|-id=526 bgcolor=#E9E9E9
| 444526 ||  || — || September 24, 2006 || Anderson Mesa || LONEOS || — || align=right | 2.3 km || 
|-id=527 bgcolor=#E9E9E9
| 444527 ||  || — || July 21, 2006 || Mount Lemmon || Mount Lemmon Survey || — || align=right | 2.1 km || 
|-id=528 bgcolor=#E9E9E9
| 444528 ||  || — || September 19, 2006 || Kitt Peak || Spacewatch || PAD || align=right | 1.3 km || 
|-id=529 bgcolor=#E9E9E9
| 444529 ||  || — || September 19, 2006 || Kitt Peak || Spacewatch || — || align=right | 1.6 km || 
|-id=530 bgcolor=#E9E9E9
| 444530 ||  || — || September 23, 2006 || Kitt Peak || Spacewatch || — || align=right | 1.8 km || 
|-id=531 bgcolor=#E9E9E9
| 444531 ||  || — || September 24, 2006 || Kitt Peak || Spacewatch || AST || align=right | 1.4 km || 
|-id=532 bgcolor=#E9E9E9
| 444532 ||  || — || September 25, 2006 || Kitt Peak || Spacewatch || — || align=right | 1.8 km || 
|-id=533 bgcolor=#E9E9E9
| 444533 ||  || — || September 25, 2006 || Kitt Peak || Spacewatch || — || align=right | 2.4 km || 
|-id=534 bgcolor=#E9E9E9
| 444534 ||  || — || September 25, 2006 || Kitt Peak || Spacewatch || — || align=right | 1.7 km || 
|-id=535 bgcolor=#E9E9E9
| 444535 ||  || — || September 25, 2006 || Anderson Mesa || LONEOS || — || align=right | 1.3 km || 
|-id=536 bgcolor=#E9E9E9
| 444536 ||  || — || September 25, 2006 || Kitt Peak || Spacewatch || — || align=right | 1.5 km || 
|-id=537 bgcolor=#E9E9E9
| 444537 ||  || — || September 15, 2006 || Kitt Peak || Spacewatch || HOF || align=right | 2.4 km || 
|-id=538 bgcolor=#E9E9E9
| 444538 ||  || — || August 30, 2006 || Anderson Mesa || LONEOS || — || align=right | 2.8 km || 
|-id=539 bgcolor=#E9E9E9
| 444539 ||  || — || August 28, 2006 || Kitt Peak || Spacewatch || AGN || align=right data-sort-value="0.93" | 930 m || 
|-id=540 bgcolor=#E9E9E9
| 444540 ||  || — || September 26, 2006 || Kitt Peak || Spacewatch || — || align=right | 1.6 km || 
|-id=541 bgcolor=#E9E9E9
| 444541 ||  || — || September 18, 2006 || Kitt Peak || Spacewatch || NEM || align=right | 2.0 km || 
|-id=542 bgcolor=#E9E9E9
| 444542 ||  || — || September 15, 2006 || Kitt Peak || Spacewatch || — || align=right | 1.9 km || 
|-id=543 bgcolor=#E9E9E9
| 444543 ||  || — || September 26, 2006 || Kitt Peak || Spacewatch || — || align=right | 2.4 km || 
|-id=544 bgcolor=#E9E9E9
| 444544 ||  || — || September 26, 2006 || Kitt Peak || Spacewatch || — || align=right | 1.7 km || 
|-id=545 bgcolor=#E9E9E9
| 444545 ||  || — || September 26, 2006 || Mount Lemmon || Mount Lemmon Survey || — || align=right | 1.8 km || 
|-id=546 bgcolor=#E9E9E9
| 444546 ||  || — || September 26, 2006 || Kitt Peak || Spacewatch || — || align=right | 2.5 km || 
|-id=547 bgcolor=#E9E9E9
| 444547 ||  || — || September 26, 2006 || Kitt Peak || Spacewatch || — || align=right | 2.0 km || 
|-id=548 bgcolor=#E9E9E9
| 444548 ||  || — || September 25, 2006 || Kitt Peak || Spacewatch || — || align=right | 1.5 km || 
|-id=549 bgcolor=#E9E9E9
| 444549 ||  || — || September 14, 2006 || Kitt Peak || Spacewatch || — || align=right | 1.7 km || 
|-id=550 bgcolor=#E9E9E9
| 444550 ||  || — || March 23, 2004 || Kitt Peak || Spacewatch || — || align=right | 1.8 km || 
|-id=551 bgcolor=#E9E9E9
| 444551 ||  || — || September 27, 2006 || Mount Lemmon || Mount Lemmon Survey || — || align=right | 1.8 km || 
|-id=552 bgcolor=#E9E9E9
| 444552 ||  || — || September 27, 2006 || Kitt Peak || Spacewatch || — || align=right | 2.2 km || 
|-id=553 bgcolor=#E9E9E9
| 444553 ||  || — || September 27, 2006 || Kitt Peak || Spacewatch || — || align=right | 1.7 km || 
|-id=554 bgcolor=#E9E9E9
| 444554 ||  || — || September 19, 2006 || Kitt Peak || Spacewatch || AGN || align=right data-sort-value="0.87" | 870 m || 
|-id=555 bgcolor=#E9E9E9
| 444555 ||  || — || September 27, 2006 || Kitt Peak || Spacewatch || — || align=right | 1.8 km || 
|-id=556 bgcolor=#E9E9E9
| 444556 ||  || — || September 28, 2006 || Kitt Peak || Spacewatch || — || align=right | 2.3 km || 
|-id=557 bgcolor=#E9E9E9
| 444557 ||  || — || September 14, 2006 || Kitt Peak || Spacewatch || — || align=right | 2.0 km || 
|-id=558 bgcolor=#E9E9E9
| 444558 ||  || — || September 28, 2006 || Kitt Peak || Spacewatch || MRX || align=right data-sort-value="0.87" | 870 m || 
|-id=559 bgcolor=#E9E9E9
| 444559 ||  || — || September 28, 2006 || Kitt Peak || Spacewatch || — || align=right | 2.5 km || 
|-id=560 bgcolor=#E9E9E9
| 444560 ||  || — || September 28, 2006 || Kitt Peak || Spacewatch || — || align=right | 2.6 km || 
|-id=561 bgcolor=#E9E9E9
| 444561 ||  || — || September 26, 2006 || Catalina || CSS || — || align=right | 2.0 km || 
|-id=562 bgcolor=#E9E9E9
| 444562 ||  || — || September 25, 2006 || Moletai || Molėtai Obs. || — || align=right | 3.1 km || 
|-id=563 bgcolor=#E9E9E9
| 444563 ||  || — || September 30, 2006 || Mount Lemmon || Mount Lemmon Survey || — || align=right | 2.0 km || 
|-id=564 bgcolor=#E9E9E9
| 444564 ||  || — || September 25, 2006 || Kitt Peak || Spacewatch || — || align=right | 1.7 km || 
|-id=565 bgcolor=#E9E9E9
| 444565 ||  || — || October 11, 2006 || Kitt Peak || Spacewatch || — || align=right | 2.3 km || 
|-id=566 bgcolor=#E9E9E9
| 444566 ||  || — || September 28, 2006 || Mount Lemmon || Mount Lemmon Survey || — || align=right | 1.7 km || 
|-id=567 bgcolor=#E9E9E9
| 444567 ||  || — || October 12, 2006 || Kitt Peak || Spacewatch || — || align=right | 2.1 km || 
|-id=568 bgcolor=#E9E9E9
| 444568 ||  || — || October 12, 2006 || Kitt Peak || Spacewatch || — || align=right | 1.9 km || 
|-id=569 bgcolor=#E9E9E9
| 444569 ||  || — || October 12, 2006 || Kitt Peak || Spacewatch || AGN || align=right | 1.1 km || 
|-id=570 bgcolor=#E9E9E9
| 444570 ||  || — || October 12, 2006 || Kitt Peak || Spacewatch || — || align=right | 2.3 km || 
|-id=571 bgcolor=#E9E9E9
| 444571 ||  || — || September 18, 2006 || Kitt Peak || Spacewatch || — || align=right | 1.8 km || 
|-id=572 bgcolor=#E9E9E9
| 444572 ||  || — || September 18, 2006 || Catalina || CSS || — || align=right | 2.1 km || 
|-id=573 bgcolor=#E9E9E9
| 444573 ||  || — || October 11, 2006 || Palomar || NEAT || — || align=right | 3.3 km || 
|-id=574 bgcolor=#E9E9E9
| 444574 ||  || — || October 11, 2006 || Palomar || NEAT || — || align=right | 3.1 km || 
|-id=575 bgcolor=#E9E9E9
| 444575 ||  || — || October 11, 2006 || Palomar || NEAT || — || align=right | 1.8 km || 
|-id=576 bgcolor=#E9E9E9
| 444576 ||  || — || October 11, 2006 || Palomar || NEAT || — || align=right | 2.6 km || 
|-id=577 bgcolor=#E9E9E9
| 444577 ||  || — || October 13, 2006 || Kitt Peak || Spacewatch || MRX || align=right data-sort-value="0.88" | 880 m || 
|-id=578 bgcolor=#E9E9E9
| 444578 ||  || — || October 2, 2006 || Mount Lemmon || Mount Lemmon Survey ||  || align=right | 1.9 km || 
|-id=579 bgcolor=#E9E9E9
| 444579 ||  || — || October 13, 2006 || Kitt Peak || Spacewatch || — || align=right | 1.9 km || 
|-id=580 bgcolor=#E9E9E9
| 444580 ||  || — || October 15, 2006 || Kitt Peak || Spacewatch || — || align=right | 1.9 km || 
|-id=581 bgcolor=#E9E9E9
| 444581 ||  || — || September 26, 2006 || Mount Lemmon || Mount Lemmon Survey || GEF || align=right | 1.3 km || 
|-id=582 bgcolor=#E9E9E9
| 444582 ||  || — || October 9, 2006 || Palomar || NEAT || — || align=right | 2.7 km || 
|-id=583 bgcolor=#E9E9E9
| 444583 ||  || — || October 2, 2006 || Mount Lemmon || Mount Lemmon Survey || — || align=right | 2.0 km || 
|-id=584 bgcolor=#FFC2E0
| 444584 ||  || — || October 17, 2006 || Kitt Peak || Spacewatch || APOPHA || align=right data-sort-value="0.32" | 320 m || 
|-id=585 bgcolor=#E9E9E9
| 444585 ||  || — || September 26, 2006 || Kitt Peak || Spacewatch || — || align=right | 2.1 km || 
|-id=586 bgcolor=#E9E9E9
| 444586 ||  || — || September 18, 2006 || Kitt Peak || Spacewatch || HOF || align=right | 2.4 km || 
|-id=587 bgcolor=#E9E9E9
| 444587 ||  || — || October 16, 2006 || Kitt Peak || Spacewatch || — || align=right | 1.6 km || 
|-id=588 bgcolor=#E9E9E9
| 444588 ||  || — || October 16, 2006 || Kitt Peak || Spacewatch || — || align=right | 1.7 km || 
|-id=589 bgcolor=#d6d6d6
| 444589 ||  || — || October 17, 2006 || Mount Lemmon || Mount Lemmon Survey || KOR || align=right | 1.2 km || 
|-id=590 bgcolor=#E9E9E9
| 444590 ||  || — || October 17, 2006 || Kitt Peak || Spacewatch || — || align=right | 2.0 km || 
|-id=591 bgcolor=#E9E9E9
| 444591 ||  || — || October 17, 2006 || Mount Lemmon || Mount Lemmon Survey || — || align=right | 2.7 km || 
|-id=592 bgcolor=#E9E9E9
| 444592 ||  || — || October 17, 2006 || Mount Lemmon || Mount Lemmon Survey || — || align=right | 1.7 km || 
|-id=593 bgcolor=#E9E9E9
| 444593 ||  || — || September 28, 2006 || Kitt Peak || Spacewatch || — || align=right | 1.8 km || 
|-id=594 bgcolor=#E9E9E9
| 444594 ||  || — || September 18, 2006 || Kitt Peak || Spacewatch || HOF || align=right | 2.1 km || 
|-id=595 bgcolor=#E9E9E9
| 444595 ||  || — || October 19, 2006 || Kitt Peak || Spacewatch || — || align=right | 1.5 km || 
|-id=596 bgcolor=#E9E9E9
| 444596 ||  || — || October 19, 2006 || Kitt Peak || Spacewatch || — || align=right | 2.0 km || 
|-id=597 bgcolor=#E9E9E9
| 444597 ||  || — || October 19, 2006 || Mount Lemmon || Mount Lemmon Survey || — || align=right | 1.9 km || 
|-id=598 bgcolor=#E9E9E9
| 444598 ||  || — || August 18, 2006 || Kitt Peak || Spacewatch || — || align=right | 2.2 km || 
|-id=599 bgcolor=#E9E9E9
| 444599 ||  || — || October 21, 2006 || Catalina || CSS || — || align=right | 2.1 km || 
|-id=600 bgcolor=#E9E9E9
| 444600 ||  || — || September 24, 2006 || Kitt Peak || Spacewatch || AST || align=right | 1.7 km || 
|}

444601–444700 

|-bgcolor=#E9E9E9
| 444601 ||  || — || October 23, 2006 || Kitt Peak || Spacewatch || — || align=right | 2.0 km || 
|-id=602 bgcolor=#E9E9E9
| 444602 ||  || — || October 2, 2006 || Mount Lemmon || Mount Lemmon Survey || — || align=right | 2.0 km || 
|-id=603 bgcolor=#E9E9E9
| 444603 ||  || — || October 17, 2006 || Mount Lemmon || Mount Lemmon Survey || — || align=right | 2.9 km || 
|-id=604 bgcolor=#E9E9E9
| 444604 ||  || — || September 26, 2006 || Mount Lemmon || Mount Lemmon Survey || — || align=right | 2.6 km || 
|-id=605 bgcolor=#E9E9E9
| 444605 ||  || — || October 4, 2006 || Mount Lemmon || Mount Lemmon Survey || — || align=right | 1.9 km || 
|-id=606 bgcolor=#d6d6d6
| 444606 ||  || — || October 20, 2006 || Kitt Peak || Spacewatch || KOR || align=right | 1.1 km || 
|-id=607 bgcolor=#E9E9E9
| 444607 ||  || — || October 27, 2006 || Mount Lemmon || Mount Lemmon Survey || — || align=right | 2.7 km || 
|-id=608 bgcolor=#E9E9E9
| 444608 ||  || — || September 14, 2006 || Kitt Peak || Spacewatch || — || align=right | 2.1 km || 
|-id=609 bgcolor=#E9E9E9
| 444609 ||  || — || October 29, 2006 || Mount Lemmon || Mount Lemmon Survey || — || align=right | 2.8 km || 
|-id=610 bgcolor=#E9E9E9
| 444610 ||  || — || October 19, 2006 || Kitt Peak || M. W. Buie || — || align=right | 1.7 km || 
|-id=611 bgcolor=#E9E9E9
| 444611 ||  || — || October 22, 2006 || Catalina || CSS || — || align=right | 2.7 km || 
|-id=612 bgcolor=#E9E9E9
| 444612 ||  || — || October 21, 2006 || Mount Lemmon || Mount Lemmon Survey || — || align=right | 2.5 km || 
|-id=613 bgcolor=#E9E9E9
| 444613 ||  || — || November 1, 2006 || Antares || ARO || — || align=right | 2.6 km || 
|-id=614 bgcolor=#d6d6d6
| 444614 ||  || — || October 21, 2006 || Mount Lemmon || Mount Lemmon Survey || critical || align=right | 2.2 km || 
|-id=615 bgcolor=#E9E9E9
| 444615 ||  || — || November 10, 2006 || Kitt Peak || Spacewatch || — || align=right | 2.2 km || 
|-id=616 bgcolor=#E9E9E9
| 444616 ||  || — || November 10, 2006 || Kitt Peak || Spacewatch || — || align=right | 2.5 km || 
|-id=617 bgcolor=#E9E9E9
| 444617 ||  || — || November 9, 2006 || Altschwendt || W. Ries || — || align=right | 2.2 km || 
|-id=618 bgcolor=#fefefe
| 444618 ||  || — || November 11, 2006 || Kitt Peak || Spacewatch || — || align=right data-sort-value="0.43" | 430 m || 
|-id=619 bgcolor=#E9E9E9
| 444619 ||  || — || November 13, 2006 || Kitt Peak || Spacewatch || HOF || align=right | 2.8 km || 
|-id=620 bgcolor=#E9E9E9
| 444620 ||  || — || October 23, 2006 || Kitt Peak || Spacewatch || HOF || align=right | 2.4 km || 
|-id=621 bgcolor=#E9E9E9
| 444621 ||  || — || November 11, 2006 || Catalina || CSS || — || align=right | 3.5 km || 
|-id=622 bgcolor=#E9E9E9
| 444622 ||  || — || September 30, 2006 || Catalina || CSS || — || align=right | 2.5 km || 
|-id=623 bgcolor=#E9E9E9
| 444623 ||  || — || October 17, 2006 || Kitt Peak || Spacewatch || — || align=right | 2.3 km || 
|-id=624 bgcolor=#E9E9E9
| 444624 ||  || — || November 13, 2006 || Catalina || CSS || — || align=right | 3.1 km || 
|-id=625 bgcolor=#d6d6d6
| 444625 ||  || — || November 1, 2006 || Mount Lemmon || Mount Lemmon Survey || — || align=right | 2.8 km || 
|-id=626 bgcolor=#E9E9E9
| 444626 ||  || — || October 2, 2006 || Mount Lemmon || Mount Lemmon Survey ||  || align=right | 2.1 km || 
|-id=627 bgcolor=#FFC2E0
| 444627 ||  || — || November 17, 2006 || Mount Lemmon || Mount Lemmon Survey || AMO || align=right data-sort-value="0.56" | 560 m || 
|-id=628 bgcolor=#FFC2E0
| 444628 ||  || — || November 18, 2006 || Catalina || CSS || AMO || align=right data-sort-value="0.46" | 460 m || 
|-id=629 bgcolor=#E9E9E9
| 444629 ||  || — || November 18, 2006 || Pla D'Arguines || R. Ferrando || — || align=right | 3.1 km || 
|-id=630 bgcolor=#E9E9E9
| 444630 ||  || — || November 16, 2006 || Kitt Peak || Spacewatch || — || align=right | 2.3 km || 
|-id=631 bgcolor=#d6d6d6
| 444631 ||  || — || November 16, 2006 || Kitt Peak || Spacewatch || EOS || align=right | 1.9 km || 
|-id=632 bgcolor=#E9E9E9
| 444632 ||  || — || November 18, 2006 || Kitt Peak || Spacewatch || — || align=right | 1.8 km || 
|-id=633 bgcolor=#E9E9E9
| 444633 ||  || — || November 18, 2006 || Kitt Peak || Spacewatch || AGN || align=right | 1.1 km || 
|-id=634 bgcolor=#d6d6d6
| 444634 ||  || — || November 19, 2006 || Kitt Peak || Spacewatch || KOR || align=right | 1.3 km || 
|-id=635 bgcolor=#E9E9E9
| 444635 ||  || — || November 18, 2006 || Mount Lemmon || Mount Lemmon Survey || — || align=right | 1.9 km || 
|-id=636 bgcolor=#d6d6d6
| 444636 ||  || — || November 19, 2006 || Socorro || LINEAR || — || align=right | 3.0 km || 
|-id=637 bgcolor=#E9E9E9
| 444637 ||  || — || November 22, 2006 || Kitt Peak || Spacewatch || AGN || align=right | 1.3 km || 
|-id=638 bgcolor=#E9E9E9
| 444638 ||  || — || November 25, 2006 || Socorro || LINEAR || — || align=right | 2.6 km || 
|-id=639 bgcolor=#d6d6d6
| 444639 ||  || — || November 24, 2006 || Kitt Peak || Spacewatch || KOR || align=right | 1.5 km || 
|-id=640 bgcolor=#E9E9E9
| 444640 ||  || — || October 17, 2006 || Catalina || CSS || — || align=right | 2.5 km || 
|-id=641 bgcolor=#d6d6d6
| 444641 ||  || — || December 11, 2006 || Kitt Peak || Spacewatch || — || align=right | 2.5 km || 
|-id=642 bgcolor=#d6d6d6
| 444642 ||  || — || December 14, 2006 || Kitt Peak || Spacewatch || — || align=right | 3.0 km || 
|-id=643 bgcolor=#d6d6d6
| 444643 ||  || — || December 21, 2006 || Mount Lemmon || Mount Lemmon Survey || — || align=right | 2.2 km || 
|-id=644 bgcolor=#d6d6d6
| 444644 ||  || — || December 21, 2006 || Mount Lemmon || Mount Lemmon Survey || EOS || align=right | 2.1 km || 
|-id=645 bgcolor=#d6d6d6
| 444645 ||  || — || December 21, 2006 || Kitt Peak || Spacewatch || EOS || align=right | 1.8 km || 
|-id=646 bgcolor=#fefefe
| 444646 ||  || — || December 17, 2006 || Mount Lemmon || Mount Lemmon Survey || — || align=right data-sort-value="0.74" | 740 m || 
|-id=647 bgcolor=#fefefe
| 444647 ||  || — || December 27, 2006 || Mount Lemmon || Mount Lemmon Survey || — || align=right data-sort-value="0.62" | 620 m || 
|-id=648 bgcolor=#d6d6d6
| 444648 ||  || — || January 17, 2007 || Kitt Peak || Spacewatch || — || align=right | 3.0 km || 
|-id=649 bgcolor=#d6d6d6
| 444649 ||  || — || January 17, 2007 || Kitt Peak || Spacewatch || — || align=right | 2.5 km || 
|-id=650 bgcolor=#d6d6d6
| 444650 ||  || — || January 17, 2007 || Kitt Peak || Spacewatch || — || align=right | 2.1 km || 
|-id=651 bgcolor=#d6d6d6
| 444651 ||  || — || January 17, 2007 || Kitt Peak || Spacewatch || — || align=right | 3.2 km || 
|-id=652 bgcolor=#d6d6d6
| 444652 ||  || — || January 24, 2007 || Socorro || LINEAR || — || align=right | 3.0 km || 
|-id=653 bgcolor=#fefefe
| 444653 ||  || — || January 24, 2007 || Mount Lemmon || Mount Lemmon Survey || — || align=right data-sort-value="0.64" | 640 m || 
|-id=654 bgcolor=#fefefe
| 444654 ||  || — || January 27, 2007 || Mount Lemmon || Mount Lemmon Survey || — || align=right data-sort-value="0.64" | 640 m || 
|-id=655 bgcolor=#fefefe
| 444655 ||  || — || January 28, 2007 || Mount Lemmon || Mount Lemmon Survey || — || align=right data-sort-value="0.73" | 730 m || 
|-id=656 bgcolor=#d6d6d6
| 444656 ||  || — || January 25, 2007 || Kitt Peak || Spacewatch || EOS || align=right | 2.0 km || 
|-id=657 bgcolor=#FA8072
| 444657 ||  || — || February 6, 2007 || Palomar || NEAT || — || align=right data-sort-value="0.81" | 810 m || 
|-id=658 bgcolor=#d6d6d6
| 444658 ||  || — || February 6, 2007 || Palomar || NEAT || — || align=right | 2.3 km || 
|-id=659 bgcolor=#d6d6d6
| 444659 ||  || — || January 27, 2007 || Kitt Peak || Spacewatch || — || align=right | 2.4 km || 
|-id=660 bgcolor=#d6d6d6
| 444660 ||  || — || February 6, 2007 || Mount Lemmon || Mount Lemmon Survey || — || align=right | 2.2 km || 
|-id=661 bgcolor=#d6d6d6
| 444661 ||  || — || January 27, 2007 || Kitt Peak || Spacewatch || EOS || align=right | 1.7 km || 
|-id=662 bgcolor=#d6d6d6
| 444662 ||  || — || February 6, 2007 || Mount Lemmon || Mount Lemmon Survey || — || align=right | 4.4 km || 
|-id=663 bgcolor=#d6d6d6
| 444663 ||  || — || February 6, 2007 || Kitt Peak || Spacewatch || — || align=right | 3.6 km || 
|-id=664 bgcolor=#d6d6d6
| 444664 ||  || — || January 17, 2007 || Catalina || CSS || — || align=right | 3.9 km || 
|-id=665 bgcolor=#d6d6d6
| 444665 ||  || — || February 13, 2007 || Mount Lemmon || Mount Lemmon Survey || THM || align=right | 1.9 km || 
|-id=666 bgcolor=#d6d6d6
| 444666 ||  || — || February 8, 2007 || Kitt Peak || Spacewatch || HYG || align=right | 3.0 km || 
|-id=667 bgcolor=#d6d6d6
| 444667 ||  || — || February 17, 2007 || Kitt Peak || Spacewatch || — || align=right | 2.7 km || 
|-id=668 bgcolor=#d6d6d6
| 444668 ||  || — || September 23, 2005 || Kitt Peak || Spacewatch || — || align=right | 2.4 km || 
|-id=669 bgcolor=#fefefe
| 444669 ||  || — || February 17, 2007 || Kitt Peak || Spacewatch || — || align=right data-sort-value="0.86" | 860 m || 
|-id=670 bgcolor=#d6d6d6
| 444670 ||  || — || February 17, 2007 || Kitt Peak || Spacewatch || HYG || align=right | 2.8 km || 
|-id=671 bgcolor=#d6d6d6
| 444671 ||  || — || January 28, 2007 || Mount Lemmon || Mount Lemmon Survey || VER || align=right | 3.5 km || 
|-id=672 bgcolor=#d6d6d6
| 444672 ||  || — || February 17, 2007 || Kitt Peak || Spacewatch || — || align=right | 3.2 km || 
|-id=673 bgcolor=#d6d6d6
| 444673 ||  || — || February 17, 2007 || Kitt Peak || Spacewatch || — || align=right | 3.0 km || 
|-id=674 bgcolor=#d6d6d6
| 444674 ||  || — || February 9, 2007 || Kitt Peak || Spacewatch || — || align=right | 3.8 km || 
|-id=675 bgcolor=#fefefe
| 444675 ||  || — || December 20, 2006 || Mount Lemmon || Mount Lemmon Survey || — || align=right data-sort-value="0.77" | 770 m || 
|-id=676 bgcolor=#d6d6d6
| 444676 ||  || — || November 21, 2006 || Mount Lemmon || Mount Lemmon Survey || EOS || align=right | 1.9 km || 
|-id=677 bgcolor=#d6d6d6
| 444677 ||  || — || February 21, 2007 || Kitt Peak || Spacewatch || — || align=right | 2.9 km || 
|-id=678 bgcolor=#fefefe
| 444678 ||  || — || March 15, 1997 || Kitt Peak || Spacewatch || — || align=right data-sort-value="0.62" | 620 m || 
|-id=679 bgcolor=#d6d6d6
| 444679 ||  || — || February 21, 2007 || Kitt Peak || Spacewatch || — || align=right | 3.2 km || 
|-id=680 bgcolor=#d6d6d6
| 444680 ||  || — || February 21, 2007 || Kitt Peak || Spacewatch || — || align=right | 2.1 km || 
|-id=681 bgcolor=#d6d6d6
| 444681 ||  || — || February 25, 2007 || Mount Lemmon || Mount Lemmon Survey || — || align=right | 2.9 km || 
|-id=682 bgcolor=#d6d6d6
| 444682 ||  || — || February 23, 2007 || Kitt Peak || Spacewatch || — || align=right | 3.1 km || 
|-id=683 bgcolor=#d6d6d6
| 444683 ||  || — || February 23, 2007 || Mount Lemmon || Mount Lemmon Survey || TEL || align=right | 1.3 km || 
|-id=684 bgcolor=#d6d6d6
| 444684 ||  || — || February 17, 2007 || Kitt Peak || Spacewatch || — || align=right | 2.5 km || 
|-id=685 bgcolor=#fefefe
| 444685 ||  || — || February 22, 2007 || Mount Graham || VATT || (1338) || align=right data-sort-value="0.74" | 740 m || 
|-id=686 bgcolor=#d6d6d6
| 444686 ||  || — || February 21, 2007 || Kitt Peak || Spacewatch || — || align=right | 3.1 km || 
|-id=687 bgcolor=#d6d6d6
| 444687 ||  || — || February 16, 2007 || Catalina || CSS || — || align=right | 3.6 km || 
|-id=688 bgcolor=#fefefe
| 444688 ||  || — || February 23, 2007 || Mount Lemmon || Mount Lemmon Survey || — || align=right data-sort-value="0.59" | 590 m || 
|-id=689 bgcolor=#d6d6d6
| 444689 ||  || — || March 9, 2007 || Wildberg || R. Apitzsch || EOS || align=right | 2.0 km || 
|-id=690 bgcolor=#d6d6d6
| 444690 ||  || — || February 23, 2007 || Mount Lemmon || Mount Lemmon Survey || — || align=right | 2.3 km || 
|-id=691 bgcolor=#fefefe
| 444691 ||  || — || February 17, 2007 || Kitt Peak || Spacewatch || — || align=right data-sort-value="0.67" | 670 m || 
|-id=692 bgcolor=#fefefe
| 444692 ||  || — || March 10, 2007 || Kitt Peak || Spacewatch || — || align=right data-sort-value="0.78" | 780 m || 
|-id=693 bgcolor=#d6d6d6
| 444693 ||  || — || March 10, 2007 || Mount Lemmon || Mount Lemmon Survey || — || align=right | 3.0 km || 
|-id=694 bgcolor=#fefefe
| 444694 ||  || — || March 11, 2007 || Mount Lemmon || Mount Lemmon Survey || — || align=right data-sort-value="0.90" | 900 m || 
|-id=695 bgcolor=#fefefe
| 444695 ||  || — || February 23, 2007 || Kitt Peak || Spacewatch || — || align=right data-sort-value="0.69" | 690 m || 
|-id=696 bgcolor=#d6d6d6
| 444696 ||  || — || March 12, 2007 || Mount Lemmon || Mount Lemmon Survey || — || align=right | 2.9 km || 
|-id=697 bgcolor=#d6d6d6
| 444697 ||  || — || February 17, 2007 || Kitt Peak || Spacewatch || — || align=right | 2.7 km || 
|-id=698 bgcolor=#fefefe
| 444698 ||  || — || March 10, 2007 || Kitt Peak || Spacewatch || (2076) || align=right data-sort-value="0.84" | 840 m || 
|-id=699 bgcolor=#d6d6d6
| 444699 ||  || — || March 10, 2007 || Mount Lemmon || Mount Lemmon Survey || — || align=right | 2.7 km || 
|-id=700 bgcolor=#d6d6d6
| 444700 ||  || — || February 7, 2007 || Mount Lemmon || Mount Lemmon Survey || — || align=right | 2.7 km || 
|}

444701–444800 

|-bgcolor=#d6d6d6
| 444701 ||  || — || March 11, 2007 || Mount Lemmon || Mount Lemmon Survey || EOS || align=right | 1.8 km || 
|-id=702 bgcolor=#d6d6d6
| 444702 ||  || — || January 28, 2007 || Mount Lemmon || Mount Lemmon Survey || HYG || align=right | 3.1 km || 
|-id=703 bgcolor=#fefefe
| 444703 ||  || — || March 10, 2007 || Mount Lemmon || Mount Lemmon Survey || — || align=right data-sort-value="0.85" | 850 m || 
|-id=704 bgcolor=#fefefe
| 444704 ||  || — || February 25, 2007 || Mount Lemmon || Mount Lemmon Survey || — || align=right data-sort-value="0.76" | 760 m || 
|-id=705 bgcolor=#d6d6d6
| 444705 ||  || — || March 9, 2007 || Mount Lemmon || Mount Lemmon Survey || — || align=right | 3.1 km || 
|-id=706 bgcolor=#fefefe
| 444706 ||  || — || March 9, 2007 || Mount Lemmon || Mount Lemmon Survey || — || align=right data-sort-value="0.65" | 650 m || 
|-id=707 bgcolor=#fefefe
| 444707 ||  || — || March 9, 2007 || Mount Lemmon || Mount Lemmon Survey || MAS || align=right data-sort-value="0.75" | 750 m || 
|-id=708 bgcolor=#d6d6d6
| 444708 ||  || — || March 9, 2007 || Mount Lemmon || Mount Lemmon Survey || — || align=right | 2.4 km || 
|-id=709 bgcolor=#d6d6d6
| 444709 ||  || — || February 17, 2007 || Mount Lemmon || Mount Lemmon Survey || EOS || align=right | 1.5 km || 
|-id=710 bgcolor=#fefefe
| 444710 ||  || — || March 12, 2007 || Kitt Peak || Spacewatch || — || align=right data-sort-value="0.62" | 620 m || 
|-id=711 bgcolor=#d6d6d6
| 444711 ||  || — || February 26, 2007 || Mount Lemmon || Mount Lemmon Survey || — || align=right | 2.8 km || 
|-id=712 bgcolor=#d6d6d6
| 444712 ||  || — || February 6, 2007 || Mount Lemmon || Mount Lemmon Survey || — || align=right | 2.7 km || 
|-id=713 bgcolor=#d6d6d6
| 444713 ||  || — || February 23, 2007 || Kitt Peak || Spacewatch || EOS || align=right | 1.9 km || 
|-id=714 bgcolor=#fefefe
| 444714 ||  || — || March 13, 2007 || Mount Lemmon || Mount Lemmon Survey || — || align=right data-sort-value="0.76" | 760 m || 
|-id=715 bgcolor=#fefefe
| 444715 ||  || — || March 13, 2007 || Kitt Peak || Spacewatch || MAS || align=right data-sort-value="0.59" | 590 m || 
|-id=716 bgcolor=#d6d6d6
| 444716 ||  || — || March 15, 2007 || Kitt Peak || Spacewatch || — || align=right | 2.8 km || 
|-id=717 bgcolor=#fefefe
| 444717 ||  || — || February 9, 2007 || Kitt Peak || Spacewatch || — || align=right | 1.1 km || 
|-id=718 bgcolor=#fefefe
| 444718 ||  || — || March 13, 2007 || Catalina || CSS || — || align=right | 1.0 km || 
|-id=719 bgcolor=#d6d6d6
| 444719 ||  || — || March 13, 2007 || Mount Lemmon || Mount Lemmon Survey || — || align=right | 3.1 km || 
|-id=720 bgcolor=#d6d6d6
| 444720 ||  || — || March 16, 2007 || Mount Lemmon || Mount Lemmon Survey || — || align=right | 2.9 km || 
|-id=721 bgcolor=#fefefe
| 444721 ||  || — || February 23, 2007 || Kitt Peak || Spacewatch || — || align=right data-sort-value="0.61" | 610 m || 
|-id=722 bgcolor=#d6d6d6
| 444722 ||  || — || March 16, 2007 || Mount Lemmon || Mount Lemmon Survey || — || align=right | 2.6 km || 
|-id=723 bgcolor=#fefefe
| 444723 ||  || — || March 13, 2007 || Catalina || CSS || — || align=right data-sort-value="0.63" | 630 m || 
|-id=724 bgcolor=#d6d6d6
| 444724 ||  || — || March 20, 2007 || Mount Lemmon || Mount Lemmon Survey || — || align=right | 2.4 km || 
|-id=725 bgcolor=#d6d6d6
| 444725 ||  || — || March 11, 2007 || Mount Lemmon || Mount Lemmon Survey || — || align=right | 3.0 km || 
|-id=726 bgcolor=#fefefe
| 444726 ||  || — || February 25, 2007 || Kitt Peak || Spacewatch || — || align=right data-sort-value="0.94" | 940 m || 
|-id=727 bgcolor=#d6d6d6
| 444727 ||  || — || February 23, 2007 || Kitt Peak || Spacewatch || VER || align=right | 2.7 km || 
|-id=728 bgcolor=#fefefe
| 444728 ||  || — || March 26, 2007 || Kitt Peak || Spacewatch || V || align=right data-sort-value="0.57" | 570 m || 
|-id=729 bgcolor=#d6d6d6
| 444729 ||  || — || March 26, 2007 || Mount Lemmon || Mount Lemmon Survey || — || align=right | 1.9 km || 
|-id=730 bgcolor=#d6d6d6
| 444730 ||  || — || March 11, 2007 || Kitt Peak || Spacewatch || — || align=right | 3.6 km || 
|-id=731 bgcolor=#fefefe
| 444731 ||  || — || April 11, 2007 || Kitt Peak || Spacewatch || — || align=right data-sort-value="0.73" | 730 m || 
|-id=732 bgcolor=#fefefe
| 444732 ||  || — || March 26, 2007 || Mount Lemmon || Mount Lemmon Survey || NYS || align=right data-sort-value="0.56" | 560 m || 
|-id=733 bgcolor=#fefefe
| 444733 ||  || — || April 15, 2007 || Mount Lemmon || Mount Lemmon Survey || — || align=right data-sort-value="0.65" | 650 m || 
|-id=734 bgcolor=#d6d6d6
| 444734 ||  || — || April 14, 2007 || Kitt Peak || Spacewatch || — || align=right | 4.2 km || 
|-id=735 bgcolor=#fefefe
| 444735 ||  || — || March 26, 2007 || Kitt Peak || Spacewatch || — || align=right data-sort-value="0.75" | 750 m || 
|-id=736 bgcolor=#fefefe
| 444736 ||  || — || April 16, 2007 || Catalina || CSS || — || align=right data-sort-value="0.82" | 820 m || 
|-id=737 bgcolor=#fefefe
| 444737 ||  || — || April 18, 2007 || Mount Lemmon || Mount Lemmon Survey || MAS || align=right data-sort-value="0.66" | 660 m || 
|-id=738 bgcolor=#fefefe
| 444738 ||  || — || March 13, 2007 || Mount Lemmon || Mount Lemmon Survey || — || align=right data-sort-value="0.62" | 620 m || 
|-id=739 bgcolor=#fefefe
| 444739 ||  || — || October 5, 2004 || Kitt Peak || Spacewatch || — || align=right data-sort-value="0.76" | 760 m || 
|-id=740 bgcolor=#fefefe
| 444740 ||  || — || April 22, 2007 || Kitt Peak || Spacewatch || — || align=right | 1.7 km || 
|-id=741 bgcolor=#d6d6d6
| 444741 ||  || — || April 22, 2007 || Kitt Peak || Spacewatch || — || align=right | 3.9 km || 
|-id=742 bgcolor=#fefefe
| 444742 ||  || — || March 11, 2007 || Kitt Peak || Spacewatch || — || align=right data-sort-value="0.57" | 570 m || 
|-id=743 bgcolor=#d6d6d6
| 444743 ||  || — || March 16, 2007 || Mount Lemmon || Mount Lemmon Survey || VER || align=right | 2.1 km || 
|-id=744 bgcolor=#fefefe
| 444744 ||  || — || April 18, 2007 || Kitt Peak || Spacewatch || NYS || align=right data-sort-value="0.63" | 630 m || 
|-id=745 bgcolor=#C2E0FF
| 444745 ||  || — || May 10, 2007 || Palomar || Palomar Obs. || plutinocritical || align=right | 357 km || 
|-id=746 bgcolor=#fefefe
| 444746 ||  || — || May 26, 2007 || Mount Lemmon || Mount Lemmon Survey || critical || align=right data-sort-value="0.59" | 590 m || 
|-id=747 bgcolor=#fefefe
| 444747 ||  || — || April 26, 2007 || Mount Lemmon || Mount Lemmon Survey || — || align=right | 1.2 km || 
|-id=748 bgcolor=#fefefe
| 444748 ||  || — || June 21, 2007 || Mount Lemmon || Mount Lemmon Survey || — || align=right | 1.1 km || 
|-id=749 bgcolor=#fefefe
| 444749 ||  || — || August 23, 2007 || Kitt Peak || Spacewatch || — || align=right | 1.2 km || 
|-id=750 bgcolor=#E9E9E9
| 444750 ||  || — || August 24, 2007 || Kitt Peak || Spacewatch || — || align=right data-sort-value="0.68" | 680 m || 
|-id=751 bgcolor=#fefefe
| 444751 ||  || — || September 5, 2007 || Catalina || CSS || H || align=right | 1.0 km || 
|-id=752 bgcolor=#fefefe
| 444752 ||  || — || September 6, 2007 || Anderson Mesa || LONEOS || H || align=right data-sort-value="0.73" | 730 m || 
|-id=753 bgcolor=#d6d6d6
| 444753 ||  || — || September 8, 2007 || Anderson Mesa || LONEOS || SHU3:2 || align=right | 5.7 km || 
|-id=754 bgcolor=#d6d6d6
| 444754 ||  || — || September 11, 2007 || Mount Lemmon || Mount Lemmon Survey || SHU3:2 || align=right | 5.5 km || 
|-id=755 bgcolor=#E9E9E9
| 444755 ||  || — || September 11, 2007 || Kitt Peak || Spacewatch || — || align=right data-sort-value="0.76" | 760 m || 
|-id=756 bgcolor=#fefefe
| 444756 ||  || — || September 14, 2007 || Catalina || CSS || H || align=right data-sort-value="0.59" | 590 m || 
|-id=757 bgcolor=#fefefe
| 444757 ||  || — || September 12, 2007 || Catalina || CSS || H || align=right data-sort-value="0.77" | 770 m || 
|-id=758 bgcolor=#fefefe
| 444758 ||  || — || September 15, 2007 || Socorro || LINEAR || H || align=right data-sort-value="0.66" | 660 m || 
|-id=759 bgcolor=#E9E9E9
| 444759 ||  || — || September 10, 2007 || Kitt Peak || Spacewatch || EUN || align=right data-sort-value="0.75" | 750 m || 
|-id=760 bgcolor=#E9E9E9
| 444760 ||  || — || September 13, 2007 || Catalina || CSS || — || align=right | 1.2 km || 
|-id=761 bgcolor=#E9E9E9
| 444761 ||  || — || September 12, 2007 || Kitt Peak || Spacewatch || — || align=right data-sort-value="0.68" | 680 m || 
|-id=762 bgcolor=#E9E9E9
| 444762 ||  || — || September 14, 2007 || Mount Lemmon || Mount Lemmon Survey || — || align=right | 1.2 km || 
|-id=763 bgcolor=#fefefe
| 444763 ||  || — || September 10, 2007 || Kitt Peak || Spacewatch || H || align=right data-sort-value="0.71" | 710 m || 
|-id=764 bgcolor=#E9E9E9
| 444764 ||  || — || September 13, 2007 || Mount Lemmon || Mount Lemmon Survey || — || align=right data-sort-value="0.80" | 800 m || 
|-id=765 bgcolor=#E9E9E9
| 444765 ||  || — || September 14, 2007 || Mount Lemmon || Mount Lemmon Survey || — || align=right data-sort-value="0.90" | 900 m || 
|-id=766 bgcolor=#E9E9E9
| 444766 ||  || — || September 14, 2007 || Mount Lemmon || Mount Lemmon Survey || — || align=right data-sort-value="0.78" | 780 m || 
|-id=767 bgcolor=#d6d6d6
| 444767 ||  || — || September 15, 2007 || Kitt Peak || Spacewatch || SHU3:2 || align=right | 5.6 km || 
|-id=768 bgcolor=#E9E9E9
| 444768 ||  || — || September 15, 2007 || Mount Lemmon || Mount Lemmon Survey || — || align=right | 1.4 km || 
|-id=769 bgcolor=#E9E9E9
| 444769 ||  || — || September 15, 2007 || Kitt Peak || Spacewatch || — || align=right data-sort-value="0.83" | 830 m || 
|-id=770 bgcolor=#E9E9E9
| 444770 ||  || — || September 12, 2007 || Mount Lemmon || Mount Lemmon Survey || — || align=right data-sort-value="0.67" | 670 m || 
|-id=771 bgcolor=#E9E9E9
| 444771 ||  || — || September 9, 2007 || Kitt Peak || Spacewatch || — || align=right data-sort-value="0.80" | 800 m || 
|-id=772 bgcolor=#fefefe
| 444772 ||  || — || September 5, 2007 || Mount Lemmon || Mount Lemmon Survey || H || align=right data-sort-value="0.64" | 640 m || 
|-id=773 bgcolor=#d6d6d6
| 444773 ||  || — || September 18, 2007 || Catalina || CSS || 3:2 || align=right | 4.4 km || 
|-id=774 bgcolor=#E9E9E9
| 444774 ||  || — || October 6, 2007 || Socorro || LINEAR || — || align=right | 1.1 km || 
|-id=775 bgcolor=#E9E9E9
| 444775 ||  || — || October 7, 2007 || Socorro || LINEAR || — || align=right data-sort-value="0.71" | 710 m || 
|-id=776 bgcolor=#FA8072
| 444776 ||  || — || September 12, 2007 || Catalina || CSS || H || align=right data-sort-value="0.81" | 810 m || 
|-id=777 bgcolor=#fefefe
| 444777 ||  || — || October 11, 2007 || Catalina || CSS || H || align=right data-sort-value="0.88" | 880 m || 
|-id=778 bgcolor=#E9E9E9
| 444778 ||  || — || October 6, 2007 || Kitt Peak || Spacewatch || — || align=right data-sort-value="0.92" | 920 m || 
|-id=779 bgcolor=#E9E9E9
| 444779 ||  || — || October 4, 2007 || Catalina || CSS || — || align=right data-sort-value="0.78" | 780 m || 
|-id=780 bgcolor=#E9E9E9
| 444780 ||  || — || October 6, 2007 || Kitt Peak || Spacewatch || — || align=right data-sort-value="0.86" | 860 m || 
|-id=781 bgcolor=#E9E9E9
| 444781 ||  || — || September 18, 2007 || Mount Lemmon || Mount Lemmon Survey || — || align=right data-sort-value="0.99" | 990 m || 
|-id=782 bgcolor=#E9E9E9
| 444782 ||  || — || October 5, 2007 || Kitt Peak || Spacewatch || — || align=right | 1.4 km || 
|-id=783 bgcolor=#E9E9E9
| 444783 ||  || — || October 7, 2007 || Mount Lemmon || Mount Lemmon Survey || — || align=right data-sort-value="0.90" | 900 m || 
|-id=784 bgcolor=#E9E9E9
| 444784 ||  || — || October 7, 2007 || Mount Lemmon || Mount Lemmon Survey || — || align=right | 1.2 km || 
|-id=785 bgcolor=#E9E9E9
| 444785 ||  || — || October 8, 2007 || Mount Lemmon || Mount Lemmon Survey || — || align=right data-sort-value="0.90" | 900 m || 
|-id=786 bgcolor=#d6d6d6
| 444786 ||  || — || October 8, 2007 || Mount Lemmon || Mount Lemmon Survey || 3:2 || align=right | 3.7 km || 
|-id=787 bgcolor=#E9E9E9
| 444787 ||  || — || October 4, 2007 || Kitt Peak || Spacewatch || — || align=right data-sort-value="0.71" | 710 m || 
|-id=788 bgcolor=#E9E9E9
| 444788 ||  || — || October 6, 2007 || Kitt Peak || Spacewatch || — || align=right data-sort-value="0.71" | 710 m || 
|-id=789 bgcolor=#E9E9E9
| 444789 ||  || — || October 6, 2007 || Kitt Peak || Spacewatch || — || align=right data-sort-value="0.68" | 680 m || 
|-id=790 bgcolor=#E9E9E9
| 444790 ||  || — || September 18, 2007 || Catalina || CSS || BRG || align=right | 1.2 km || 
|-id=791 bgcolor=#E9E9E9
| 444791 ||  || — || September 8, 2007 || Catalina || CSS || EUN || align=right | 1.7 km || 
|-id=792 bgcolor=#d6d6d6
| 444792 ||  || — || November 1, 1999 || Kitt Peak || Spacewatch || Tj (2.97) || align=right | 3.7 km || 
|-id=793 bgcolor=#E9E9E9
| 444793 ||  || — || October 8, 2007 || Kitt Peak || Spacewatch || — || align=right data-sort-value="0.68" | 680 m || 
|-id=794 bgcolor=#d6d6d6
| 444794 ||  || — || October 11, 2007 || Mount Lemmon || Mount Lemmon Survey || SHU3:2critical || align=right | 4.8 km || 
|-id=795 bgcolor=#E9E9E9
| 444795 ||  || — || October 7, 2007 || Kitt Peak || Spacewatch || — || align=right | 1.0 km || 
|-id=796 bgcolor=#E9E9E9
| 444796 ||  || — || October 8, 2007 || Kitt Peak || Spacewatch || — || align=right data-sort-value="0.79" | 790 m || 
|-id=797 bgcolor=#E9E9E9
| 444797 ||  || — || October 8, 2007 || Kitt Peak || Spacewatch || — || align=right data-sort-value="0.75" | 750 m || 
|-id=798 bgcolor=#fefefe
| 444798 ||  || — || October 9, 2007 || Mount Lemmon || Mount Lemmon Survey || H || align=right data-sort-value="0.47" | 470 m || 
|-id=799 bgcolor=#E9E9E9
| 444799 ||  || — || October 9, 2007 || Mount Lemmon || Mount Lemmon Survey || — || align=right data-sort-value="0.90" | 900 m || 
|-id=800 bgcolor=#E9E9E9
| 444800 ||  || — || October 19, 2003 || Kitt Peak || Spacewatch || — || align=right data-sort-value="0.71" | 710 m || 
|}

444801–444900 

|-bgcolor=#E9E9E9
| 444801 ||  || — || October 11, 2007 || Mount Lemmon || Mount Lemmon Survey || — || align=right data-sort-value="0.88" | 880 m || 
|-id=802 bgcolor=#E9E9E9
| 444802 ||  || — || October 11, 2007 || Kitt Peak || Spacewatch || — || align=right data-sort-value="0.90" | 900 m || 
|-id=803 bgcolor=#E9E9E9
| 444803 ||  || — || October 12, 2007 || Catalina || CSS || — || align=right | 1.2 km || 
|-id=804 bgcolor=#E9E9E9
| 444804 ||  || — || October 15, 2007 || Kitt Peak || Spacewatch || — || align=right data-sort-value="0.69" | 690 m || 
|-id=805 bgcolor=#E9E9E9
| 444805 ||  || — || October 10, 2007 || Kitt Peak || Spacewatch || — || align=right data-sort-value="0.65" | 650 m || 
|-id=806 bgcolor=#E9E9E9
| 444806 ||  || — || October 10, 2007 || Kitt Peak || Spacewatch || — || align=right | 1.3 km || 
|-id=807 bgcolor=#E9E9E9
| 444807 ||  || — || September 14, 2007 || Mount Lemmon || Mount Lemmon Survey || — || align=right data-sort-value="0.75" | 750 m || 
|-id=808 bgcolor=#d6d6d6
| 444808 ||  || — || October 7, 2007 || Catalina || CSS || 3:2 || align=right | 5.3 km || 
|-id=809 bgcolor=#E9E9E9
| 444809 ||  || — || October 11, 2007 || Catalina || CSS || — || align=right | 1.1 km || 
|-id=810 bgcolor=#E9E9E9
| 444810 ||  || — || September 8, 2007 || Catalina || CSS || critical || align=right | 1.2 km || 
|-id=811 bgcolor=#E9E9E9
| 444811 ||  || — || October 17, 2007 || Anderson Mesa || LONEOS || — || align=right data-sort-value="0.78" | 780 m || 
|-id=812 bgcolor=#E9E9E9
| 444812 ||  || — || October 18, 2007 || Anderson Mesa || LONEOS || — || align=right | 1.8 km || 
|-id=813 bgcolor=#fefefe
| 444813 ||  || — || August 8, 2007 || Socorro || LINEAR || MAS || align=right data-sort-value="0.92" | 920 m || 
|-id=814 bgcolor=#E9E9E9
| 444814 ||  || — || October 16, 2007 || Kitt Peak || Spacewatch || — || align=right data-sort-value="0.86" | 860 m || 
|-id=815 bgcolor=#E9E9E9
| 444815 ||  || — || October 16, 2007 || Kitt Peak || Spacewatch || — || align=right data-sort-value="0.69" | 690 m || 
|-id=816 bgcolor=#E9E9E9
| 444816 ||  || — || October 8, 2007 || Mount Lemmon || Mount Lemmon Survey || — || align=right data-sort-value="0.80" | 800 m || 
|-id=817 bgcolor=#E9E9E9
| 444817 ||  || — || October 16, 2007 || Catalina || CSS || — || align=right | 1.5 km || 
|-id=818 bgcolor=#E9E9E9
| 444818 ||  || — || September 10, 2007 || Mount Lemmon || Mount Lemmon Survey || (5) || align=right data-sort-value="0.86" | 860 m || 
|-id=819 bgcolor=#E9E9E9
| 444819 ||  || — || October 18, 2007 || Mount Lemmon || Mount Lemmon Survey || KON || align=right | 1.7 km || 
|-id=820 bgcolor=#E9E9E9
| 444820 ||  || — || October 18, 2007 || Kitt Peak || Spacewatch || EUN || align=right | 1.3 km || 
|-id=821 bgcolor=#E9E9E9
| 444821 ||  || — || September 18, 2007 || Mount Lemmon || Mount Lemmon Survey || — || align=right data-sort-value="0.80" | 800 m || 
|-id=822 bgcolor=#E9E9E9
| 444822 ||  || — || October 16, 2007 || Kitt Peak || Spacewatch || — || align=right data-sort-value="0.87" | 870 m || 
|-id=823 bgcolor=#E9E9E9
| 444823 ||  || — || October 21, 2007 || Kitt Peak || Spacewatch || — || align=right data-sort-value="0.87" | 870 m || 
|-id=824 bgcolor=#E9E9E9
| 444824 ||  || — || October 24, 2007 || Mount Lemmon || Mount Lemmon Survey || — || align=right | 1.2 km || 
|-id=825 bgcolor=#fefefe
| 444825 ||  || — || October 16, 2007 || Catalina || CSS || H || align=right | 1.1 km || 
|-id=826 bgcolor=#E9E9E9
| 444826 ||  || — || October 18, 2007 || Kitt Peak || Spacewatch || EUN || align=right | 1.2 km || 
|-id=827 bgcolor=#E9E9E9
| 444827 ||  || — || October 19, 2007 || Catalina || CSS || — || align=right | 1.2 km || 
|-id=828 bgcolor=#E9E9E9
| 444828 ||  || — || November 2, 2007 || Catalina || CSS || — || align=right | 2.2 km || 
|-id=829 bgcolor=#E9E9E9
| 444829 ||  || — || November 2, 2007 || Mount Lemmon || Mount Lemmon Survey || — || align=right data-sort-value="0.79" | 790 m || 
|-id=830 bgcolor=#E9E9E9
| 444830 ||  || — || November 2, 2007 || Catalina || CSS || — || align=right | 1.3 km || 
|-id=831 bgcolor=#E9E9E9
| 444831 ||  || — || November 1, 2007 || Kitt Peak || Spacewatch || — || align=right data-sort-value="0.87" | 870 m || 
|-id=832 bgcolor=#E9E9E9
| 444832 ||  || — || November 2, 2007 || Kitt Peak || Spacewatch || — || align=right data-sort-value="0.57" | 570 m || 
|-id=833 bgcolor=#E9E9E9
| 444833 ||  || — || November 2, 2007 || Kitt Peak || Spacewatch || — || align=right data-sort-value="0.81" | 810 m || 
|-id=834 bgcolor=#E9E9E9
| 444834 ||  || — || November 2, 2007 || Kitt Peak || Spacewatch || (5) || align=right data-sort-value="0.74" | 740 m || 
|-id=835 bgcolor=#E9E9E9
| 444835 ||  || — || October 16, 2007 || Mount Lemmon || Mount Lemmon Survey || — || align=right data-sort-value="0.65" | 650 m || 
|-id=836 bgcolor=#E9E9E9
| 444836 ||  || — || October 12, 2007 || Kitt Peak || Spacewatch || — || align=right | 1.2 km || 
|-id=837 bgcolor=#E9E9E9
| 444837 ||  || — || September 25, 2007 || Mount Lemmon || Mount Lemmon Survey || — || align=right data-sort-value="0.83" | 830 m || 
|-id=838 bgcolor=#E9E9E9
| 444838 ||  || — || November 2, 2007 || Socorro || LINEAR || — || align=right | 1.9 km || 
|-id=839 bgcolor=#E9E9E9
| 444839 ||  || — || September 10, 2007 || Mount Lemmon || Mount Lemmon Survey || BRG || align=right | 1.2 km || 
|-id=840 bgcolor=#fefefe
| 444840 ||  || — || November 8, 2007 || Socorro || LINEAR || H || align=right data-sort-value="0.72" | 720 m || 
|-id=841 bgcolor=#E9E9E9
| 444841 ||  || — || November 2, 2007 || Catalina || CSS || EUN || align=right | 1.4 km || 
|-id=842 bgcolor=#E9E9E9
| 444842 ||  || — || November 1, 2007 || Kitt Peak || Spacewatch || — || align=right data-sort-value="0.75" | 750 m || 
|-id=843 bgcolor=#E9E9E9
| 444843 ||  || — || November 2, 2007 || Kitt Peak || Spacewatch || — || align=right data-sort-value="0.75" | 750 m || 
|-id=844 bgcolor=#E9E9E9
| 444844 ||  || — || November 2, 2007 || Kitt Peak || Spacewatch || — || align=right data-sort-value="0.85" | 850 m || 
|-id=845 bgcolor=#E9E9E9
| 444845 ||  || — || November 2, 2007 || Kitt Peak || Spacewatch || — || align=right | 2.2 km || 
|-id=846 bgcolor=#E9E9E9
| 444846 ||  || — || September 14, 2007 || Mount Lemmon || Mount Lemmon Survey || — || align=right data-sort-value="0.65" | 650 m || 
|-id=847 bgcolor=#E9E9E9
| 444847 ||  || — || November 3, 2007 || Kitt Peak || Spacewatch || — || align=right | 1.4 km || 
|-id=848 bgcolor=#E9E9E9
| 444848 ||  || — || October 20, 2007 || Mount Lemmon || Mount Lemmon Survey || (5) || align=right data-sort-value="0.64" | 640 m || 
|-id=849 bgcolor=#E9E9E9
| 444849 ||  || — || November 5, 2007 || Kitt Peak || Spacewatch || — || align=right | 1.3 km || 
|-id=850 bgcolor=#E9E9E9
| 444850 ||  || — || November 7, 2007 || Mount Lemmon || Mount Lemmon Survey || — || align=right data-sort-value="0.87" | 870 m || 
|-id=851 bgcolor=#E9E9E9
| 444851 ||  || — || October 9, 2007 || Mount Lemmon || Mount Lemmon Survey || — || align=right | 1.2 km || 
|-id=852 bgcolor=#E9E9E9
| 444852 ||  || — || October 30, 2007 || Kitt Peak || Spacewatch || — || align=right | 1.2 km || 
|-id=853 bgcolor=#E9E9E9
| 444853 ||  || — || October 31, 2007 || Kitt Peak || Spacewatch || MAR || align=right | 1.2 km || 
|-id=854 bgcolor=#E9E9E9
| 444854 ||  || — || November 11, 2007 || Bisei SG Center || BATTeRS || — || align=right | 1.7 km || 
|-id=855 bgcolor=#E9E9E9
| 444855 ||  || — || October 8, 2007 || Mount Lemmon || Mount Lemmon Survey || — || align=right data-sort-value="0.75" | 750 m || 
|-id=856 bgcolor=#E9E9E9
| 444856 ||  || — || October 8, 2007 || Mount Lemmon || Mount Lemmon Survey || KON || align=right | 1.7 km || 
|-id=857 bgcolor=#E9E9E9
| 444857 ||  || — || November 1, 2007 || Kitt Peak || Spacewatch || — || align=right | 1.2 km || 
|-id=858 bgcolor=#E9E9E9
| 444858 ||  || — || November 9, 2007 || Kitt Peak || Spacewatch || — || align=right data-sort-value="0.80" | 800 m || 
|-id=859 bgcolor=#E9E9E9
| 444859 ||  || — || September 14, 2007 || Mount Lemmon || Mount Lemmon Survey || (5) || align=right data-sort-value="0.74" | 740 m || 
|-id=860 bgcolor=#E9E9E9
| 444860 ||  || — || August 24, 2007 || Kitt Peak || Spacewatch || RAF || align=right | 1.2 km || 
|-id=861 bgcolor=#E9E9E9
| 444861 ||  || — || October 5, 2007 || Kitt Peak || Spacewatch || — || align=right data-sort-value="0.87" | 870 m || 
|-id=862 bgcolor=#E9E9E9
| 444862 ||  || — || October 15, 2007 || Mount Lemmon || Mount Lemmon Survey || — || align=right data-sort-value="0.79" | 790 m || 
|-id=863 bgcolor=#E9E9E9
| 444863 ||  || — || November 3, 2007 || Catalina || CSS || — || align=right | 1.1 km || 
|-id=864 bgcolor=#E9E9E9
| 444864 ||  || — || November 12, 2007 || Mount Lemmon || Mount Lemmon Survey || (5) || align=right data-sort-value="0.74" | 740 m || 
|-id=865 bgcolor=#E9E9E9
| 444865 ||  || — || November 13, 2007 || Kitt Peak || Spacewatch || — || align=right data-sort-value="0.71" | 710 m || 
|-id=866 bgcolor=#E9E9E9
| 444866 ||  || — || October 14, 2007 || Mount Lemmon || Mount Lemmon Survey || (5) || align=right data-sort-value="0.87" | 870 m || 
|-id=867 bgcolor=#E9E9E9
| 444867 ||  || — || October 15, 2007 || Kitt Peak || Spacewatch || — || align=right | 1.1 km || 
|-id=868 bgcolor=#E9E9E9
| 444868 ||  || — || November 14, 2007 || Kitt Peak || Spacewatch || — || align=right data-sort-value="0.83" | 830 m || 
|-id=869 bgcolor=#E9E9E9
| 444869 ||  || — || November 14, 2007 || Kitt Peak || Spacewatch || — || align=right | 1.2 km || 
|-id=870 bgcolor=#fefefe
| 444870 ||  || — || November 11, 2007 || Catalina || CSS || H || align=right data-sort-value="0.70" | 700 m || 
|-id=871 bgcolor=#E9E9E9
| 444871 ||  || — || November 8, 2007 || Mount Lemmon || Mount Lemmon Survey || (5) || align=right data-sort-value="0.81" | 810 m || 
|-id=872 bgcolor=#E9E9E9
| 444872 ||  || — || November 6, 2007 || Kitt Peak || Spacewatch || — || align=right data-sort-value="0.93" | 930 m || 
|-id=873 bgcolor=#E9E9E9
| 444873 ||  || — || November 9, 2007 || Kitt Peak || Spacewatch || — || align=right | 1.2 km || 
|-id=874 bgcolor=#E9E9E9
| 444874 ||  || — || November 12, 2007 || Mount Lemmon || Mount Lemmon Survey || — || align=right | 1.7 km || 
|-id=875 bgcolor=#E9E9E9
| 444875 ||  || — || November 2, 2007 || Kitt Peak || Spacewatch || (5) || align=right data-sort-value="0.94" | 940 m || 
|-id=876 bgcolor=#E9E9E9
| 444876 ||  || — || November 8, 2007 || Kitt Peak || Spacewatch || (5) || align=right data-sort-value="0.74" | 740 m || 
|-id=877 bgcolor=#E9E9E9
| 444877 ||  || — || November 12, 2007 || Mount Lemmon || Mount Lemmon Survey || — || align=right | 2.1 km || 
|-id=878 bgcolor=#E9E9E9
| 444878 ||  || — || November 6, 2007 || Kitt Peak || Spacewatch || (5) || align=right data-sort-value="0.90" | 900 m || 
|-id=879 bgcolor=#E9E9E9
| 444879 ||  || — || September 14, 2007 || Mount Lemmon || Mount Lemmon Survey || — || align=right | 1.2 km || 
|-id=880 bgcolor=#E9E9E9
| 444880 ||  || — || October 15, 2007 || Socorro || LINEAR || (5) || align=right data-sort-value="0.68" | 680 m || 
|-id=881 bgcolor=#E9E9E9
| 444881 ||  || — || November 7, 2007 || Socorro || LINEAR || (5) || align=right | 1.0 km || 
|-id=882 bgcolor=#E9E9E9
| 444882 ||  || — || September 15, 2007 || Mount Lemmon || Mount Lemmon Survey || — || align=right | 1.2 km || 
|-id=883 bgcolor=#E9E9E9
| 444883 ||  || — || November 7, 2007 || Kitt Peak || Spacewatch || — || align=right | 1.1 km || 
|-id=884 bgcolor=#E9E9E9
| 444884 ||  || — || November 18, 2007 || Mount Lemmon || Mount Lemmon Survey || — || align=right | 1.4 km || 
|-id=885 bgcolor=#d6d6d6
| 444885 ||  || — || November 18, 2007 || Mount Lemmon || Mount Lemmon Survey || SHU3:2 || align=right | 4.8 km || 
|-id=886 bgcolor=#E9E9E9
| 444886 ||  || — || November 18, 2007 || Socorro || LINEAR || — || align=right data-sort-value="0.90" | 900 m || 
|-id=887 bgcolor=#E9E9E9
| 444887 ||  || — || November 20, 2007 || Mount Lemmon || Mount Lemmon Survey || — || align=right | 1.4 km || 
|-id=888 bgcolor=#E9E9E9
| 444888 ||  || — || November 18, 2007 || Mount Lemmon || Mount Lemmon Survey || — || align=right | 2.3 km || 
|-id=889 bgcolor=#E9E9E9
| 444889 ||  || — || November 18, 2007 || Mount Lemmon || Mount Lemmon Survey || EUN || align=right | 1.3 km || 
|-id=890 bgcolor=#d6d6d6
| 444890 ||  || — || November 20, 2007 || Mount Lemmon || Mount Lemmon Survey || — || align=right | 3.8 km || 
|-id=891 bgcolor=#E9E9E9
| 444891 ||  || — || December 8, 2007 || La Sagra || OAM Obs. || (5) || align=right data-sort-value="0.82" | 820 m || 
|-id=892 bgcolor=#E9E9E9
| 444892 ||  || — || November 2, 2007 || Socorro || LINEAR || — || align=right data-sort-value="0.96" | 960 m || 
|-id=893 bgcolor=#E9E9E9
| 444893 ||  || — || December 14, 2007 || Catalina || CSS || — || align=right | 1.2 km || 
|-id=894 bgcolor=#E9E9E9
| 444894 ||  || — || November 2, 2007 || Kitt Peak || Spacewatch || RAF || align=right data-sort-value="0.92" | 920 m || 
|-id=895 bgcolor=#d6d6d6
| 444895 ||  || — || December 15, 2007 || Kitt Peak || Spacewatch || — || align=right | 3.4 km || 
|-id=896 bgcolor=#E9E9E9
| 444896 ||  || — || December 5, 2007 || Kitt Peak || Spacewatch || (5) || align=right data-sort-value="0.89" | 890 m || 
|-id=897 bgcolor=#E9E9E9
| 444897 ||  || — || December 5, 2007 || Kitt Peak || Spacewatch || — || align=right data-sort-value="0.82" | 820 m || 
|-id=898 bgcolor=#E9E9E9
| 444898 ||  || — || December 4, 2007 || Socorro || LINEAR || — || align=right | 1.1 km || 
|-id=899 bgcolor=#E9E9E9
| 444899 ||  || — || November 5, 2007 || Mount Lemmon || Mount Lemmon Survey || EUN || align=right | 1.3 km || 
|-id=900 bgcolor=#E9E9E9
| 444900 ||  || — || December 15, 2007 || Catalina || CSS || — || align=right | 1.3 km || 
|}

444901–445000 

|-bgcolor=#E9E9E9
| 444901 ||  || — || November 19, 2007 || Kitt Peak || Spacewatch || (5) || align=right data-sort-value="0.81" | 810 m || 
|-id=902 bgcolor=#E9E9E9
| 444902 ||  || — || December 30, 2007 || Catalina || CSS || — || align=right | 1.3 km || 
|-id=903 bgcolor=#E9E9E9
| 444903 ||  || — || December 28, 2007 || Kitt Peak || Spacewatch || — || align=right | 1.4 km || 
|-id=904 bgcolor=#E9E9E9
| 444904 ||  || — || December 30, 2007 || Mount Lemmon || Mount Lemmon Survey || — || align=right | 1.5 km || 
|-id=905 bgcolor=#E9E9E9
| 444905 ||  || — || November 2, 2007 || Mount Lemmon || Mount Lemmon Survey || (5) || align=right data-sort-value="0.89" | 890 m || 
|-id=906 bgcolor=#E9E9E9
| 444906 ||  || — || December 30, 2007 || Kitt Peak || Spacewatch || — || align=right | 1.4 km || 
|-id=907 bgcolor=#E9E9E9
| 444907 ||  || — || December 29, 2007 || Lulin || LUSS || — || align=right | 1.8 km || 
|-id=908 bgcolor=#E9E9E9
| 444908 ||  || — || November 18, 2007 || Socorro || LINEAR || — || align=right | 3.1 km || 
|-id=909 bgcolor=#E9E9E9
| 444909 ||  || — || December 31, 2007 || Mount Lemmon || Mount Lemmon Survey || — || align=right | 1.5 km || 
|-id=910 bgcolor=#E9E9E9
| 444910 ||  || — || December 18, 2007 || Kitt Peak || Spacewatch || — || align=right | 1.5 km || 
|-id=911 bgcolor=#E9E9E9
| 444911 ||  || — || December 18, 2007 || Kitt Peak || Spacewatch || AGN || align=right | 1.0 km || 
|-id=912 bgcolor=#E9E9E9
| 444912 ||  || — || November 3, 2007 || Socorro || LINEAR || — || align=right | 2.1 km || 
|-id=913 bgcolor=#E9E9E9
| 444913 ||  || — || September 10, 2007 || Mount Lemmon || Mount Lemmon Survey || — || align=right | 1.3 km || 
|-id=914 bgcolor=#E9E9E9
| 444914 ||  || — || January 10, 2008 || Mount Lemmon || Mount Lemmon Survey || — || align=right | 2.0 km || 
|-id=915 bgcolor=#E9E9E9
| 444915 ||  || — || December 30, 2007 || Mount Lemmon || Mount Lemmon Survey || — || align=right | 1.1 km || 
|-id=916 bgcolor=#E9E9E9
| 444916 ||  || — || January 8, 2008 || Altschwendt || W. Ries || MIS || align=right | 2.2 km || 
|-id=917 bgcolor=#E9E9E9
| 444917 ||  || — || January 10, 2008 || Catalina || CSS || — || align=right | 1.3 km || 
|-id=918 bgcolor=#E9E9E9
| 444918 ||  || — || December 30, 2007 || Mount Lemmon || Mount Lemmon Survey || — || align=right | 1.4 km || 
|-id=919 bgcolor=#d6d6d6
| 444919 ||  || — || January 11, 2008 || Kitt Peak || Spacewatch || KOR || align=right | 1.2 km || 
|-id=920 bgcolor=#E9E9E9
| 444920 ||  || — || November 11, 2007 || Mount Lemmon || Mount Lemmon Survey || — || align=right | 1.3 km || 
|-id=921 bgcolor=#E9E9E9
| 444921 ||  || — || November 3, 2007 || Mount Lemmon || Mount Lemmon Survey || — || align=right | 1.4 km || 
|-id=922 bgcolor=#E9E9E9
| 444922 ||  || — || January 14, 2008 || Kitt Peak || Spacewatch || — || align=right | 1.8 km || 
|-id=923 bgcolor=#E9E9E9
| 444923 ||  || — || November 11, 2007 || Mount Lemmon || Mount Lemmon Survey || — || align=right | 1.5 km || 
|-id=924 bgcolor=#E9E9E9
| 444924 ||  || — || December 14, 2007 || Mount Lemmon || Mount Lemmon Survey || — || align=right | 2.4 km || 
|-id=925 bgcolor=#E9E9E9
| 444925 ||  || — || January 11, 2008 || Mount Lemmon || Mount Lemmon Survey || — || align=right | 2.1 km || 
|-id=926 bgcolor=#E9E9E9
| 444926 ||  || — || January 14, 2008 || Kitt Peak || Spacewatch || — || align=right | 2.3 km || 
|-id=927 bgcolor=#E9E9E9
| 444927 ||  || — || January 3, 2008 || Purple Mountain || PMO NEO || — || align=right | 1.4 km || 
|-id=928 bgcolor=#E9E9E9
| 444928 ||  || — || January 1, 2008 || Kitt Peak || Spacewatch || — || align=right | 1.6 km || 
|-id=929 bgcolor=#FA8072
| 444929 ||  || — || January 15, 2008 || Socorro || LINEAR || — || align=right | 1.3 km || 
|-id=930 bgcolor=#E9E9E9
| 444930 ||  || — || January 30, 2008 || Catalina || CSS || — || align=right | 1.6 km || 
|-id=931 bgcolor=#E9E9E9
| 444931 ||  || — || November 8, 2007 || Mount Lemmon || Mount Lemmon Survey || — || align=right | 1.8 km || 
|-id=932 bgcolor=#E9E9E9
| 444932 ||  || — || January 30, 2008 || Kitt Peak || Spacewatch || GEF || align=right | 1.3 km || 
|-id=933 bgcolor=#d6d6d6
| 444933 ||  || — || January 18, 2008 || Kitt Peak || Spacewatch || — || align=right | 3.5 km || 
|-id=934 bgcolor=#E9E9E9
| 444934 ||  || — || January 19, 2008 || Mount Lemmon || Mount Lemmon Survey || — || align=right | 1.4 km || 
|-id=935 bgcolor=#FFC2E0
| 444935 ||  || — || February 3, 2008 || Mount Lemmon || Mount Lemmon Survey || AMO || align=right data-sort-value="0.49" | 490 m || 
|-id=936 bgcolor=#E9E9E9
| 444936 ||  || — || February 1, 2008 || Lulin Observatory || LUSS || — || align=right | 1.9 km || 
|-id=937 bgcolor=#d6d6d6
| 444937 ||  || — || February 3, 2008 || Kitt Peak || Spacewatch || — || align=right | 2.4 km || 
|-id=938 bgcolor=#E9E9E9
| 444938 ||  || — || February 1, 2008 || Kitt Peak || Spacewatch ||  || align=right | 1.8 km || 
|-id=939 bgcolor=#E9E9E9
| 444939 ||  || — || January 13, 2008 || Kitt Peak || Spacewatch || — || align=right | 2.1 km || 
|-id=940 bgcolor=#E9E9E9
| 444940 ||  || — || February 2, 2008 || Kitt Peak || Spacewatch || — || align=right | 1.8 km || 
|-id=941 bgcolor=#d6d6d6
| 444941 ||  || — || February 2, 2008 || Kitt Peak || Spacewatch || — || align=right | 3.1 km || 
|-id=942 bgcolor=#E9E9E9
| 444942 ||  || — || December 14, 2007 || Mount Lemmon || Mount Lemmon Survey || — || align=right | 1.8 km || 
|-id=943 bgcolor=#E9E9E9
| 444943 ||  || — || February 7, 2008 || Mount Lemmon || Mount Lemmon Survey || MRX || align=right data-sort-value="0.80" | 800 m || 
|-id=944 bgcolor=#E9E9E9
| 444944 ||  || — || February 7, 2008 || Mount Lemmon || Mount Lemmon Survey || — || align=right | 1.8 km || 
|-id=945 bgcolor=#d6d6d6
| 444945 ||  || — || November 19, 2007 || Mount Lemmon || Mount Lemmon Survey || — || align=right | 2.7 km || 
|-id=946 bgcolor=#E9E9E9
| 444946 ||  || — || February 7, 2008 || Kitt Peak || Spacewatch || — || align=right | 2.5 km || 
|-id=947 bgcolor=#E9E9E9
| 444947 ||  || — || February 8, 2008 || Kitt Peak || Spacewatch || — || align=right | 1.9 km || 
|-id=948 bgcolor=#E9E9E9
| 444948 ||  || — || January 1, 2008 || Kitt Peak || Spacewatch || — || align=right | 1.7 km || 
|-id=949 bgcolor=#E9E9E9
| 444949 ||  || — || February 9, 2008 || Catalina || CSS || — || align=right | 1.7 km || 
|-id=950 bgcolor=#E9E9E9
| 444950 ||  || — || February 9, 2008 || Kitt Peak || Spacewatch || EUN || align=right | 1.2 km || 
|-id=951 bgcolor=#d6d6d6
| 444951 ||  || — || February 7, 2008 || Mount Lemmon || Mount Lemmon Survey || — || align=right | 2.7 km || 
|-id=952 bgcolor=#E9E9E9
| 444952 ||  || — || February 8, 2008 || Kitt Peak || Spacewatch || — || align=right | 2.2 km || 
|-id=953 bgcolor=#d6d6d6
| 444953 ||  || — || February 9, 2008 || Kitt Peak || Spacewatch || — || align=right | 2.3 km || 
|-id=954 bgcolor=#d6d6d6
| 444954 ||  || — || February 7, 2008 || Kitt Peak || Spacewatch || — || align=right | 2.3 km || 
|-id=955 bgcolor=#d6d6d6
| 444955 ||  || — || February 2, 2008 || Mount Lemmon || Mount Lemmon Survey || — || align=right | 2.2 km || 
|-id=956 bgcolor=#d6d6d6
| 444956 ||  || — || February 13, 2008 || Mount Lemmon || Mount Lemmon Survey || — || align=right | 1.8 km || 
|-id=957 bgcolor=#E9E9E9
| 444957 ||  || — || February 1, 2008 || Kitt Peak || Spacewatch || — || align=right | 1.6 km || 
|-id=958 bgcolor=#E9E9E9
| 444958 ||  || — || February 25, 2008 || Mount Lemmon || Mount Lemmon Survey || — || align=right | 2.5 km || 
|-id=959 bgcolor=#d6d6d6
| 444959 ||  || — || February 26, 2008 || Mount Lemmon || Mount Lemmon Survey || KOR || align=right | 1.6 km || 
|-id=960 bgcolor=#E9E9E9
| 444960 ||  || — || February 29, 2008 || Purple Mountain || PMO NEO ||  || align=right | 2.3 km || 
|-id=961 bgcolor=#d6d6d6
| 444961 ||  || — || February 10, 2008 || Kitt Peak || Spacewatch || EOS || align=right | 1.6 km || 
|-id=962 bgcolor=#d6d6d6
| 444962 ||  || — || February 28, 2008 || Mount Lemmon || Mount Lemmon Survey || — || align=right | 3.4 km || 
|-id=963 bgcolor=#E9E9E9
| 444963 ||  || — || November 14, 2007 || Mount Lemmon || Mount Lemmon Survey || — || align=right | 1.5 km || 
|-id=964 bgcolor=#E9E9E9
| 444964 ||  || — || February 24, 2008 || Mount Lemmon || Mount Lemmon Survey || AST || align=right | 1.7 km || 
|-id=965 bgcolor=#d6d6d6
| 444965 ||  || — || February 28, 2008 || Kitt Peak || Spacewatch || EOS || align=right | 2.3 km || 
|-id=966 bgcolor=#d6d6d6
| 444966 ||  || — || February 28, 2008 || Kitt Peak || Spacewatch || — || align=right | 2.2 km || 
|-id=967 bgcolor=#FA8072
| 444967 ||  || — || March 1, 2008 || Kitt Peak || Spacewatch || H || align=right data-sort-value="0.67" | 670 m || 
|-id=968 bgcolor=#d6d6d6
| 444968 ||  || — || March 1, 2008 || Kitt Peak || Spacewatch || EOS || align=right | 1.5 km || 
|-id=969 bgcolor=#d6d6d6
| 444969 ||  || — || March 3, 2008 || XuYi || PMO NEO || — || align=right | 3.2 km || 
|-id=970 bgcolor=#E9E9E9
| 444970 ||  || — || March 4, 2008 || Kitt Peak || Spacewatch || — || align=right | 3.4 km || 
|-id=971 bgcolor=#d6d6d6
| 444971 ||  || — || February 28, 2008 || Mount Lemmon || Mount Lemmon Survey || — || align=right | 2.0 km || 
|-id=972 bgcolor=#d6d6d6
| 444972 ||  || — || February 24, 2008 || Mount Lemmon || Mount Lemmon Survey || — || align=right | 2.5 km || 
|-id=973 bgcolor=#E9E9E9
| 444973 ||  || — || February 10, 2008 || Mount Lemmon || Mount Lemmon Survey || GEF || align=right | 1.3 km || 
|-id=974 bgcolor=#d6d6d6
| 444974 ||  || — || February 12, 2008 || Mount Lemmon || Mount Lemmon Survey || — || align=right | 2.7 km || 
|-id=975 bgcolor=#d6d6d6
| 444975 ||  || — || February 28, 2008 || Kitt Peak || Spacewatch || LIX || align=right | 3.5 km || 
|-id=976 bgcolor=#d6d6d6
| 444976 ||  || — || February 28, 2008 || Kitt Peak || Spacewatch || EOS || align=right | 2.3 km || 
|-id=977 bgcolor=#d6d6d6
| 444977 ||  || — || March 8, 2008 || Kitt Peak || Spacewatch || — || align=right | 2.2 km || 
|-id=978 bgcolor=#E9E9E9
| 444978 ||  || — || February 10, 2008 || Mount Lemmon || Mount Lemmon Survey || — || align=right | 2.0 km || 
|-id=979 bgcolor=#d6d6d6
| 444979 ||  || — || March 11, 2008 || Kitt Peak || Spacewatch || — || align=right | 4.2 km || 
|-id=980 bgcolor=#d6d6d6
| 444980 ||  || — || March 8, 2008 || Mount Lemmon || Mount Lemmon Survey || KOR || align=right | 1.4 km || 
|-id=981 bgcolor=#d6d6d6
| 444981 ||  || — || March 10, 2008 || Kitt Peak || Spacewatch || — || align=right | 2.2 km || 
|-id=982 bgcolor=#d6d6d6
| 444982 ||  || — || March 10, 2008 || Kitt Peak || Spacewatch || — || align=right | 2.8 km || 
|-id=983 bgcolor=#E9E9E9
| 444983 ||  || — || February 2, 2008 || Kitt Peak || Spacewatch || — || align=right | 2.3 km || 
|-id=984 bgcolor=#d6d6d6
| 444984 ||  || — || March 27, 2008 || Kitt Peak || Spacewatch || — || align=right | 2.3 km || 
|-id=985 bgcolor=#d6d6d6
| 444985 ||  || — || March 28, 2008 || Mount Lemmon || Mount Lemmon Survey || — || align=right | 2.0 km || 
|-id=986 bgcolor=#d6d6d6
| 444986 ||  || — || February 13, 2008 || Mount Lemmon || Mount Lemmon Survey || — || align=right | 2.3 km || 
|-id=987 bgcolor=#d6d6d6
| 444987 ||  || — || March 8, 2008 || Kitt Peak || Spacewatch || — || align=right | 2.2 km || 
|-id=988 bgcolor=#d6d6d6
| 444988 ||  || — || March 27, 2008 || Mount Lemmon || Mount Lemmon Survey || — || align=right | 2.1 km || 
|-id=989 bgcolor=#E9E9E9
| 444989 ||  || — || March 29, 2008 || Mount Lemmon || Mount Lemmon Survey || — || align=right | 2.1 km || 
|-id=990 bgcolor=#d6d6d6
| 444990 ||  || — || March 30, 2008 || Kitt Peak || Spacewatch || EOS || align=right | 1.8 km || 
|-id=991 bgcolor=#d6d6d6
| 444991 ||  || — || March 31, 2008 || Mount Lemmon || Mount Lemmon Survey || NAE || align=right | 1.7 km || 
|-id=992 bgcolor=#d6d6d6
| 444992 ||  || — || March 31, 2008 || Mount Lemmon || Mount Lemmon Survey || — || align=right | 2.5 km || 
|-id=993 bgcolor=#d6d6d6
| 444993 ||  || — || February 26, 2008 || Kitt Peak || Spacewatch || — || align=right | 2.9 km || 
|-id=994 bgcolor=#d6d6d6
| 444994 ||  || — || October 1, 2000 || Kitt Peak || Spacewatch || NAE || align=right | 1.9 km || 
|-id=995 bgcolor=#fefefe
| 444995 ||  || — || April 3, 2008 || Kitt Peak || Spacewatch || — || align=right data-sort-value="0.69" | 690 m || 
|-id=996 bgcolor=#d6d6d6
| 444996 ||  || — || April 5, 2008 || Mount Lemmon || Mount Lemmon Survey || — || align=right | 2.7 km || 
|-id=997 bgcolor=#d6d6d6
| 444997 ||  || — || April 7, 2008 || Mount Lemmon || Mount Lemmon Survey || — || align=right | 2.1 km || 
|-id=998 bgcolor=#d6d6d6
| 444998 ||  || — || March 30, 2008 || Kitt Peak || Spacewatch || EOS || align=right | 1.7 km || 
|-id=999 bgcolor=#d6d6d6
| 444999 ||  || — || April 9, 2008 || Kitt Peak || Spacewatch || THM || align=right | 2.1 km || 
|-id=000 bgcolor=#d6d6d6
| 445000 ||  || — || April 6, 2008 || Kitt Peak || Spacewatch || — || align=right | 3.2 km || 
|}

References

External links 
 Discovery Circumstances: Numbered Minor Planets (440001)–(445000) (IAU Minor Planet Center)

0444